= Rosario =

City in Santa Fe Province, Argentina

- City and municipality
- City of Rosario; Ciudad de Rosario
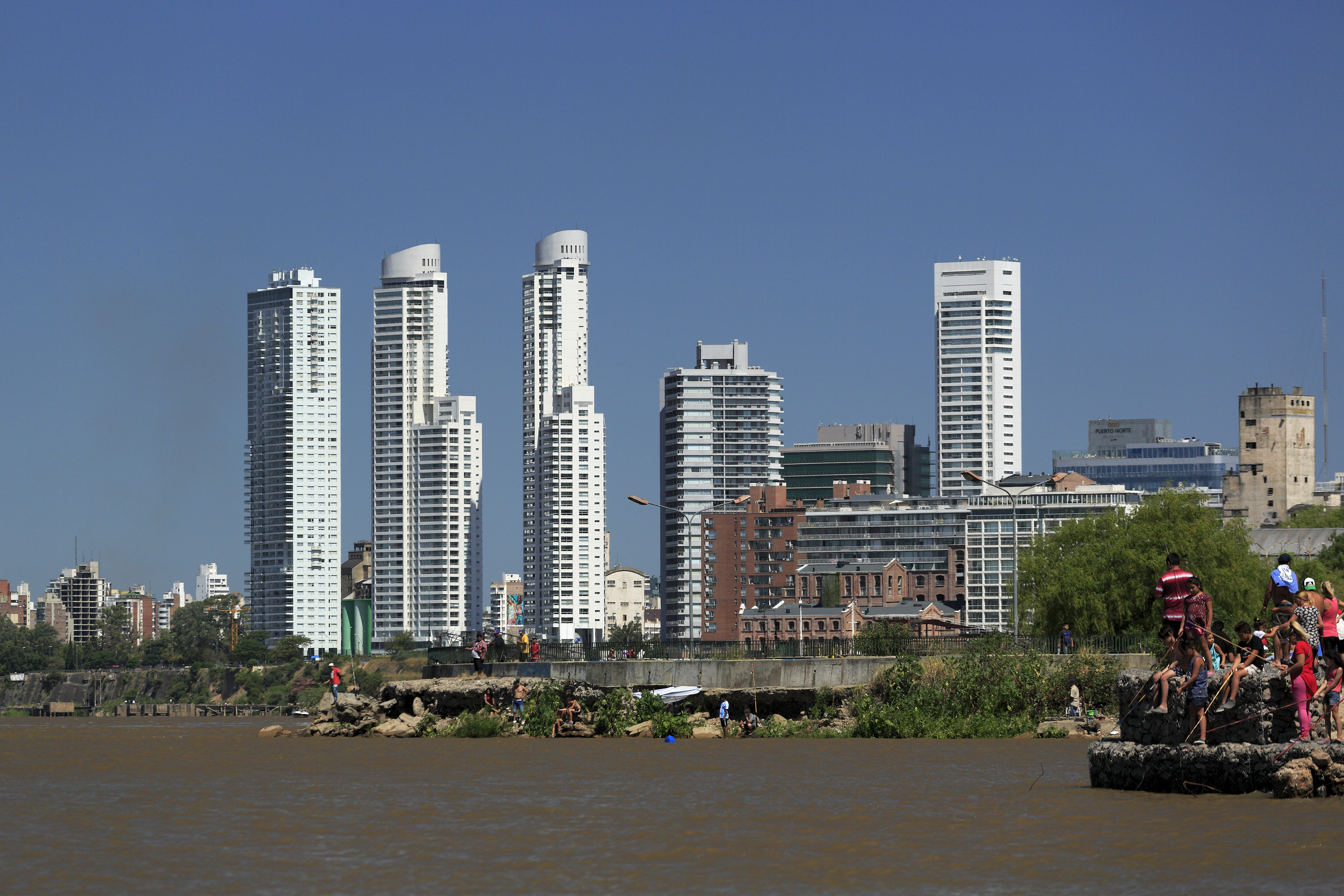
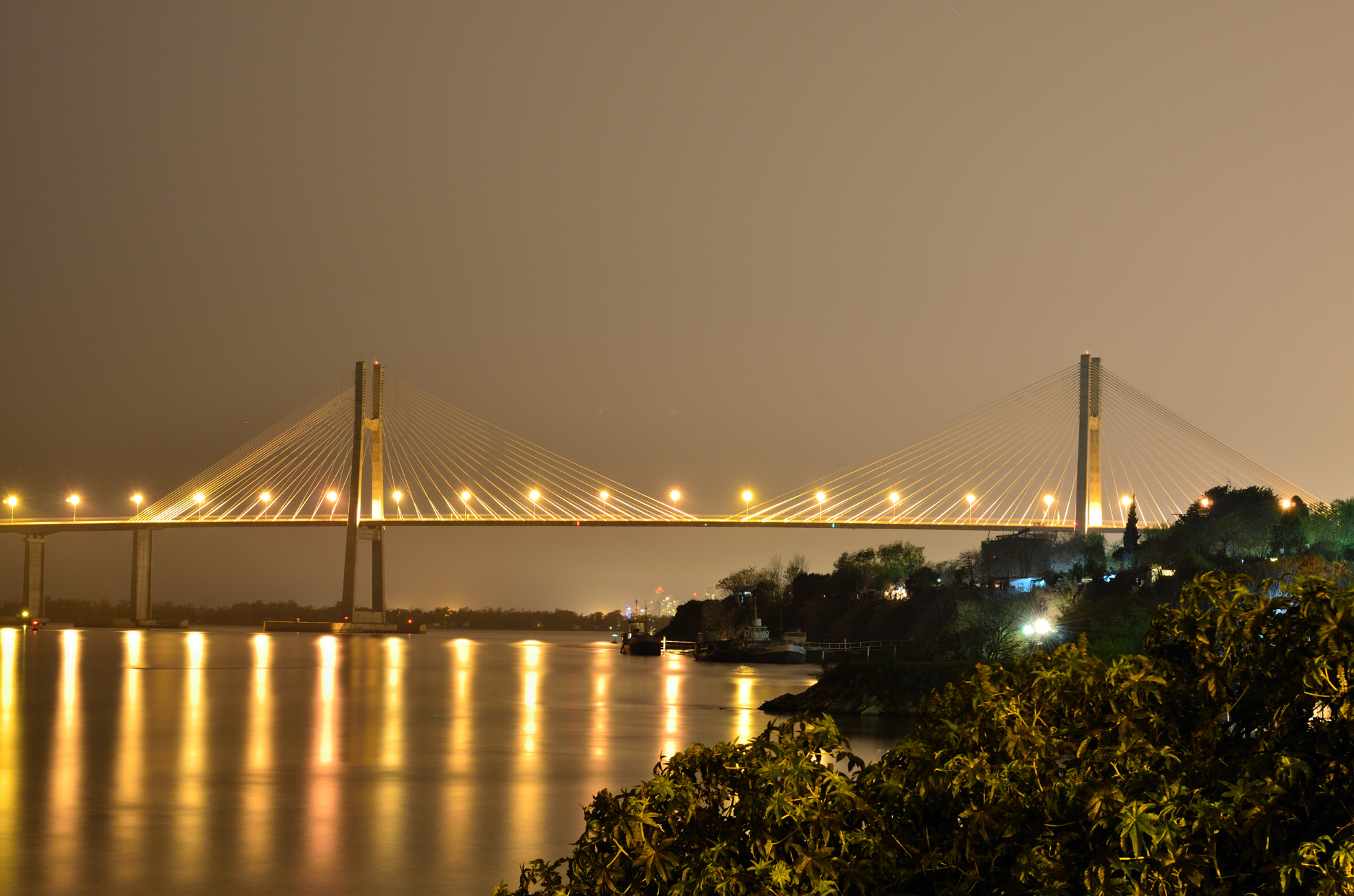
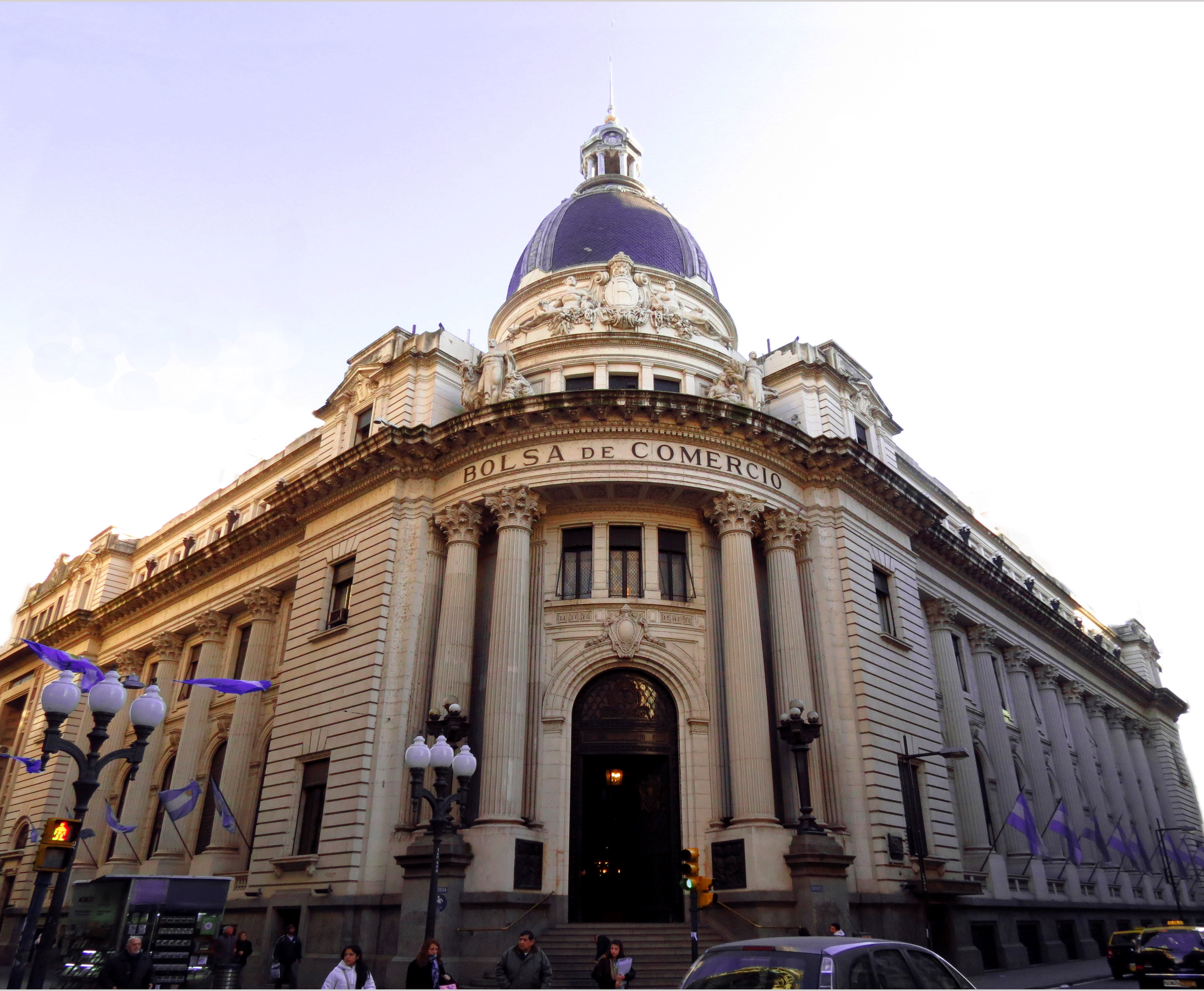
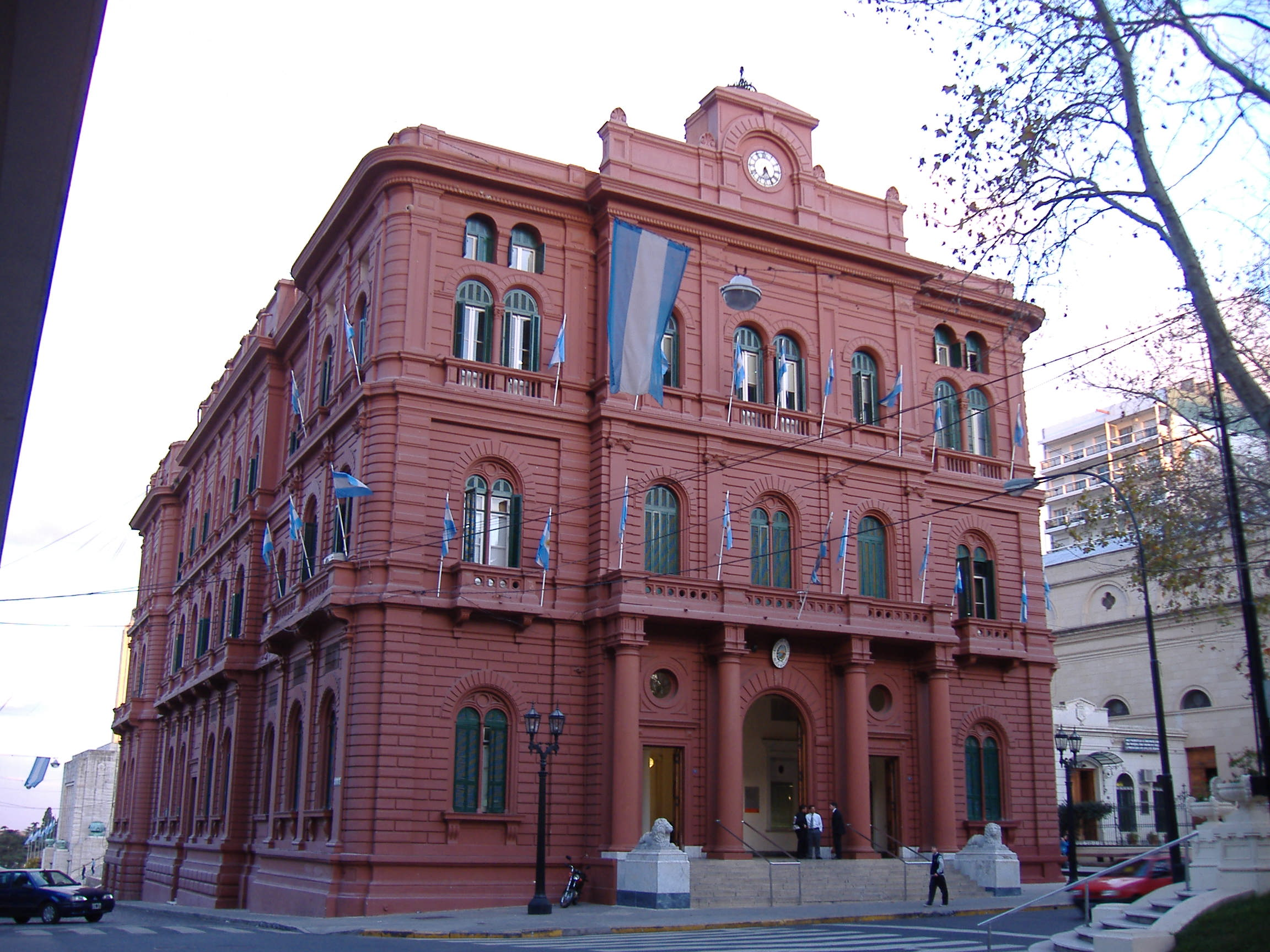
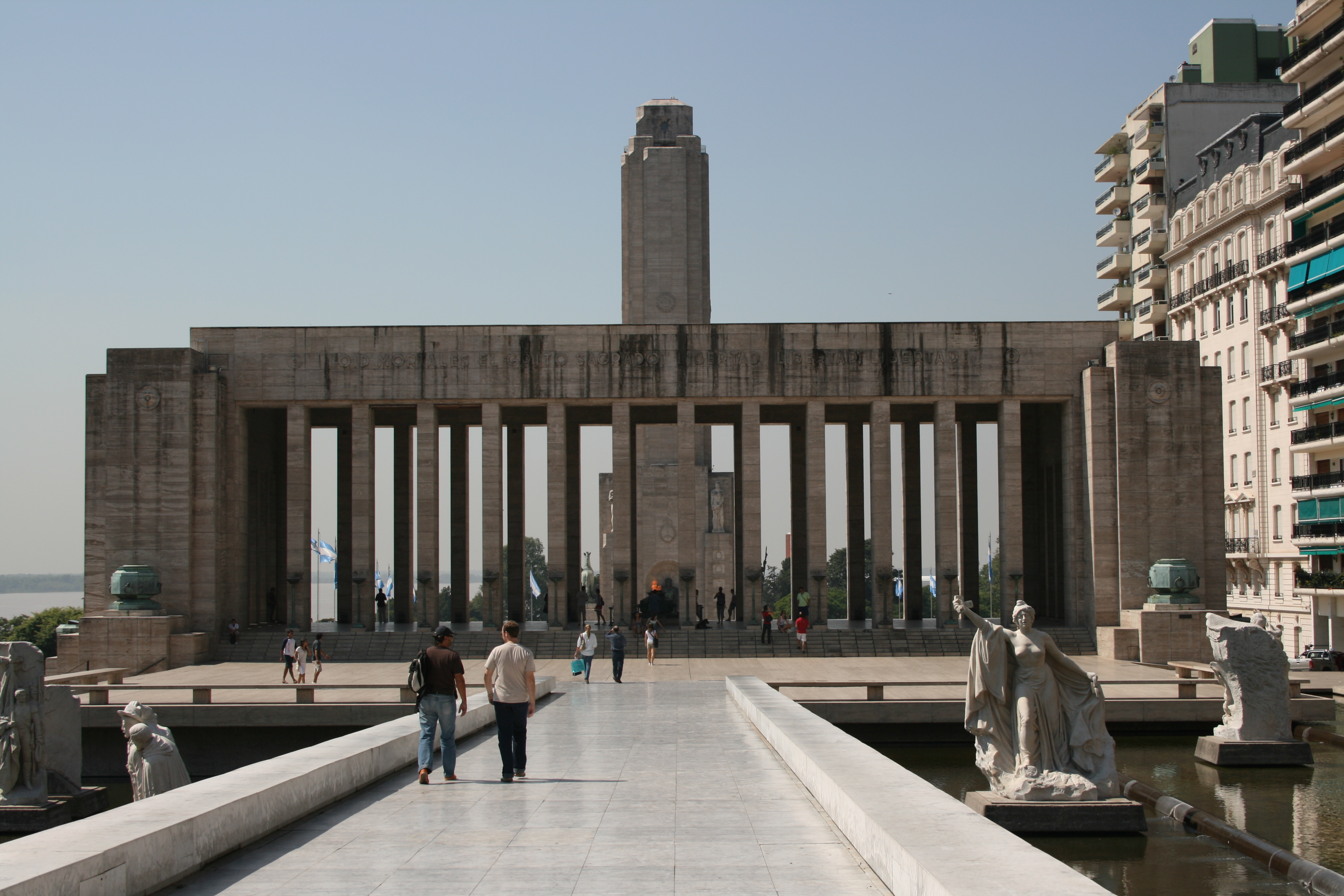
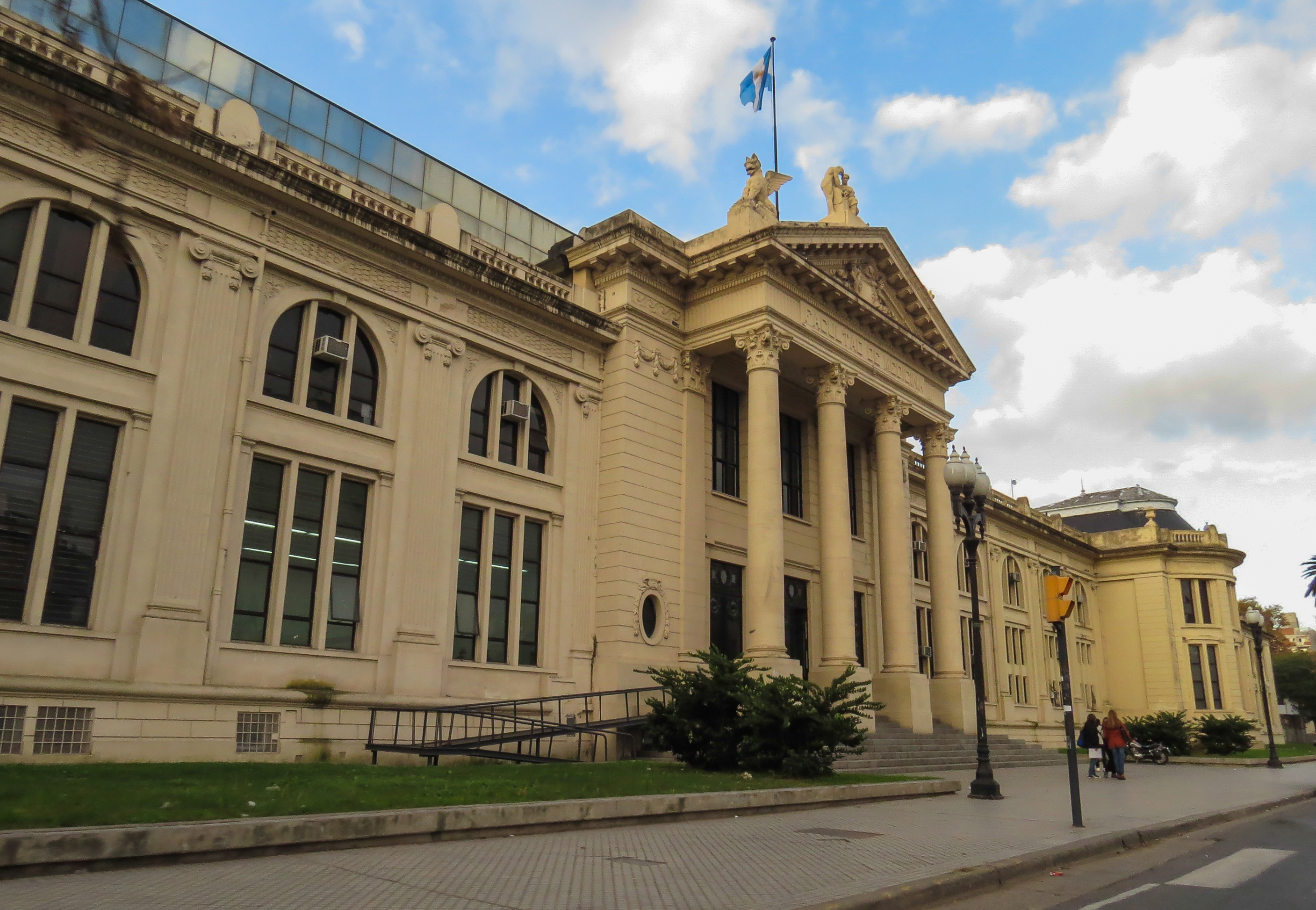
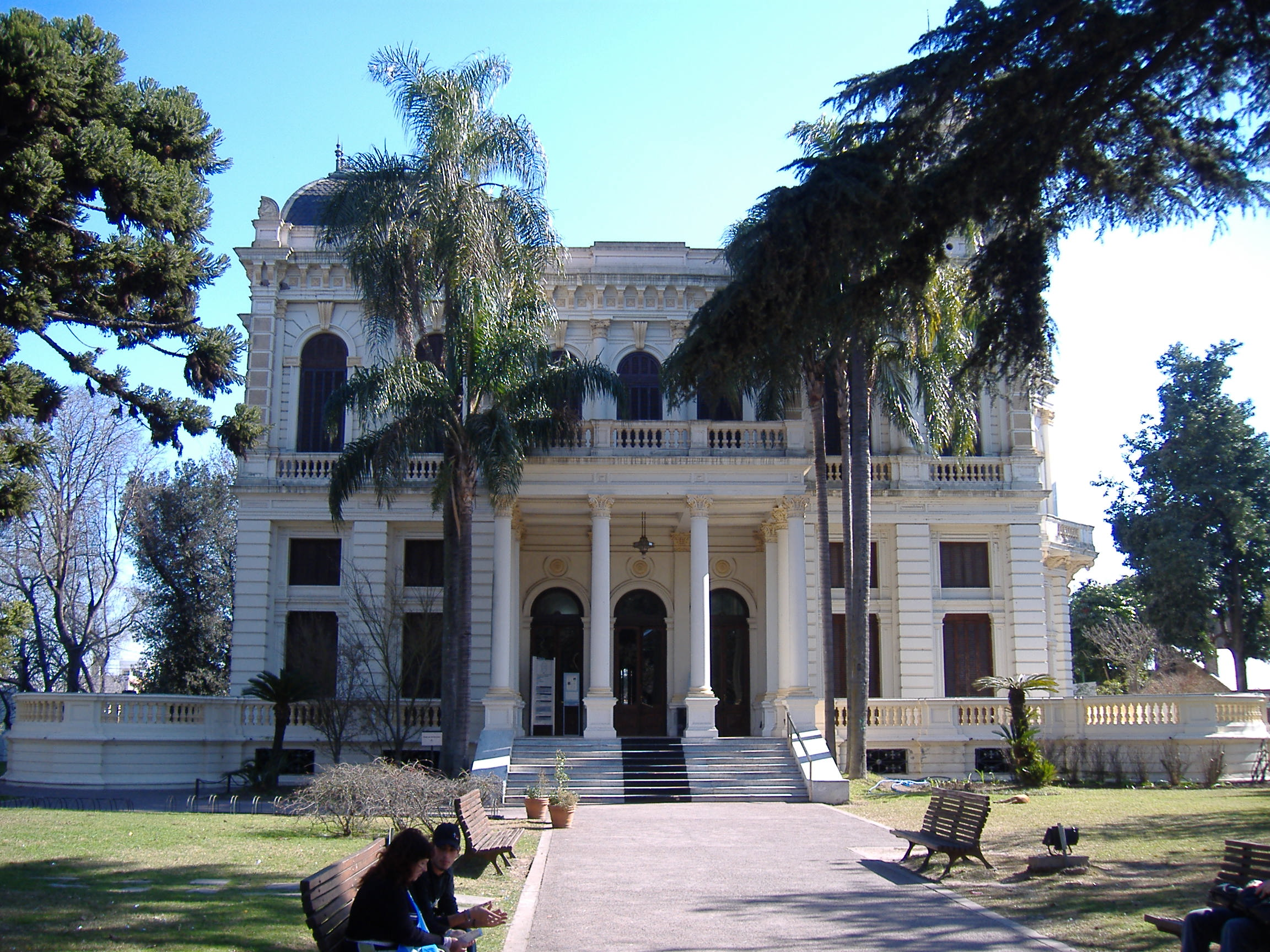
- Rosario skyline Rosario-Victoria Bridge Rosario Board of Trade Palace of the Lions National Flag Memorial National University of Rosario Villa Hortensia

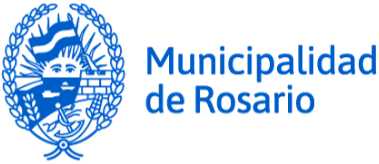
- Flag Coat of arms Brandmark
- Nicknames: "Birthplace of the Argentine Flag", "The Argentine Chicago"
- Location of Rosario in Argentina Rosario (Argentina) Rosario (South America)
- Coordinates: 32°57′27″S 60°38′22″W
- Country: Argentina
- Department: Rosario
- Districts: North, Center, South, Southwest, Northwest

Government
  - Body: Municipality of Rosario
  - Intendant: Pablo Javkin (CREO Party)

Area
  - City: 178.69 km^{2} (68.99 sq mi)
- Elevation: 31 m (102 ft)

Population (2012 estimated)
  - City and municipality: 1,276,000
  - Rank: 3rd in Argentina
  - Density: 6,680/km^{2} (17,300/sq mi)
  - Metro: 1,613,041
- Demonym(s): Rosarian rosarino, -a

GDP (PPP, constant 2015 values)
  - Year: 2023
  - Total: $37.9 billion
  - Per capita: $23,700
- Time zone: UTC−3 (ART)
- Post code: S2000
- Area code: 0341
- Website: rosario.gob.ar

Rosario, (Note: (Spanish pronunciation: [roˈsaɾjo])) officially the Autonomous City of Rosario, (Note: Spanish: Ciudad Autónoma de Rosario (CAR).) is the largest city of the province of Santa Fe, in central Argentina. Located 300 km (186 mi) northwest of Buenos Aires on the west bank of the Paraná River, in the south of the province, it is the country's third-most populous city after Buenos Aires and Córdoba. With a growing and important metropolitan area, Greater Rosario has an estimated population of 1,750,000 as of 2020. One of its main attractions includes the neoclassical, Art Nouveau, and Art Deco architecture that has been preserved in hundreds of residences, houses and public buildings. The city is also famous for being the birthplace of revolutionary Marxist Che Guevara and footballer Lionel Messi.

Rosario is the head city of the Rosario Department and is located at the heart of the major industrial corridor in Argentina. The city is a major railroad terminal and the shipping center for north-eastern Argentina. Ships reach the city via the Paraná River, which allows the existence of a 10-metre-deep (34 ft) port. The Port of Rosario is subject to silting and must be dredged periodically. Exports include wheat, flour, hay, linseed and other vegetable oils, corn, sugar, lumber, meat, hides, and wool. Manufactured goods include flour, sugar, meat products, and other foodstuffs. The Rosario-Victoria Bridge, opened in 2003, spans the Paraná River, connecting Rosario with the city of Victoria, across the Paraná Delta. The city plays a critical role in agricultural commerce, and thus finds itself at the center of a continuing debate over taxes levied on big-ticket agricultural goods such as soy.

Along with Paraná, Rosario is one of the few Argentine cities that cannot point to a particular individual as its founder. The city's patron is the "Virgin of the Rosary", whose feast day is 7 October.

== History ==
=== Early settlement ===
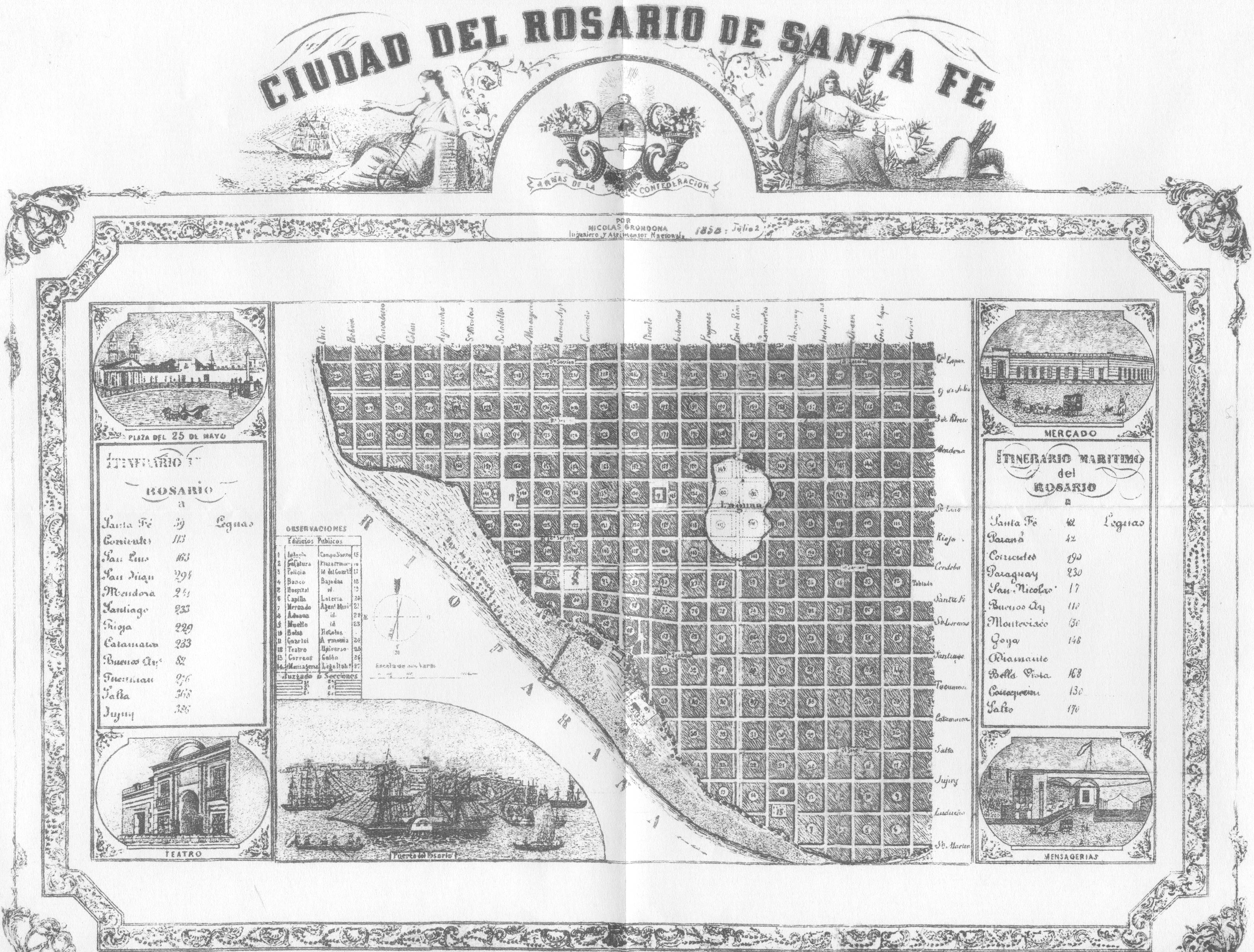
Map of the city of Rosario c. 1877

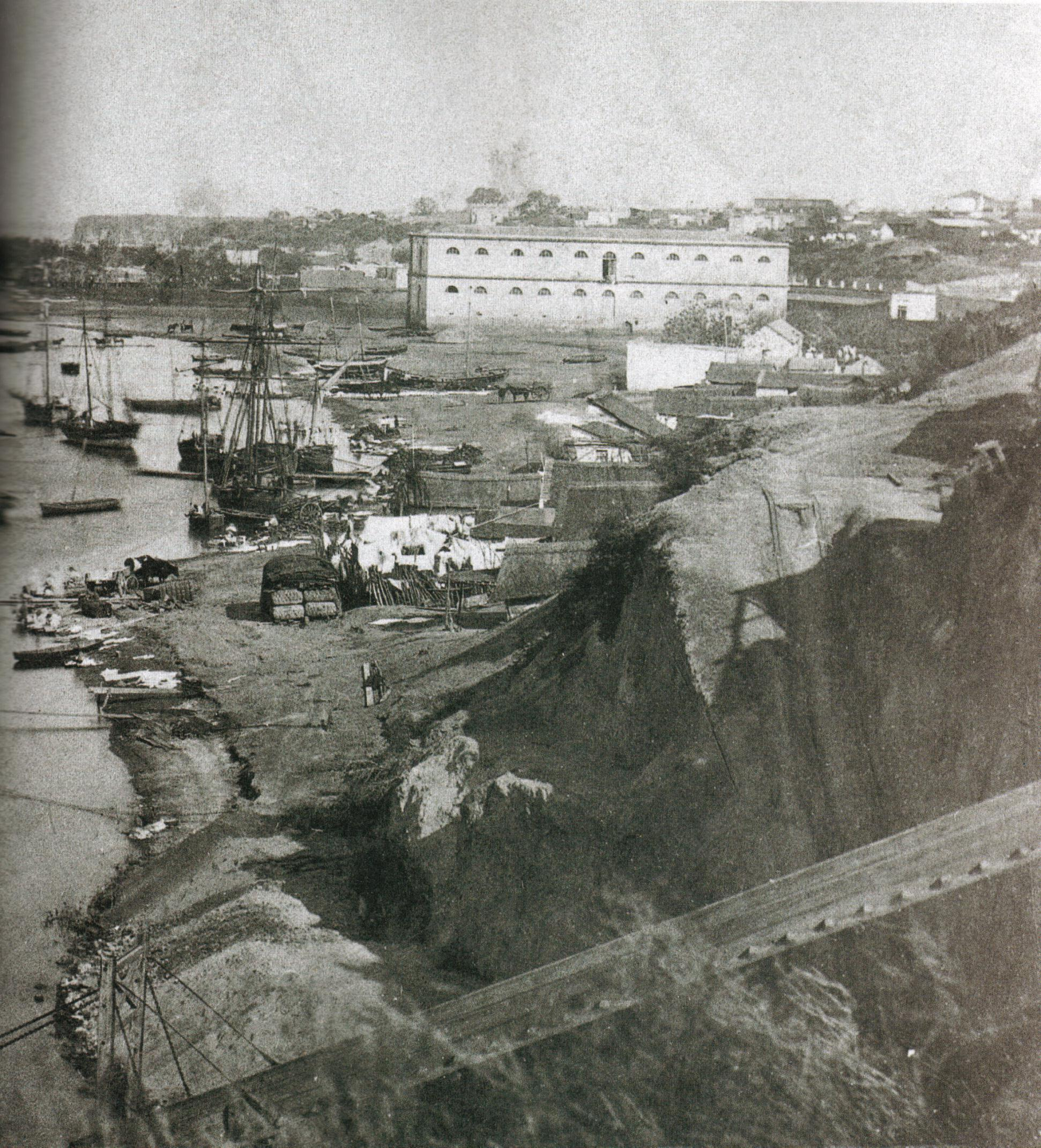
Rosario port area in 1888

Even though the city did not have a clear foundation date or any official acknowledgement thereof, most commentators state that Rosario was founded on 7 October 1793 with a local population of 457 inhabitants. Nonetheless, the town was officially declared a city on 3 August 1852, at the time it was known as Pago de los Arroyos ("land of the streams"), a reference to the several small rivers that traverse the southern region of Santa Fe, like the Ludueña Stream, the Saladillo Stream and others, emptying into the Paraná River. In 1689, captain Luís Romero de Piñeda received part of the lands of the Pago de los Arroyos by royal decree, as payment for services to the Spanish Crown. Before that, the area was originally inhabited by various indigenous tribes, some of which lived in reducciones, a type of mission founded by Franciscans. These missions were ultimately attacked and destroyed by hostile tribes of the Chaco region.

Romero de Piñeda established the first permanent settlement, an estancia — intended as farmland, not as a town. In 1719, the Jesuits bought another part and established Estancia San Miguel. The area was still so scarcely populated that it had no central authority; it was ruled from the provincial capital (Santa Fe), and in turn from Buenos Aires.

In 1724, another colonial settlement was initiated by Santiago de Montenegro, who set up a mill, drew plans for the future town, built a chapel, and was appointed mayor in 1751. The area of control of this local government extended northward from today's Rosario; only in 1784 was it divided into two smaller jurisdictions.

On February 27, 1812, General Manuel Belgrano raised the newly created Argentine flag on the shores of the Paraná, for the first time. Because of this, Rosario is known as the "Cradle of the Argentine Flag". The National Flag Memorial marks the occasion.

=== 19th century ===
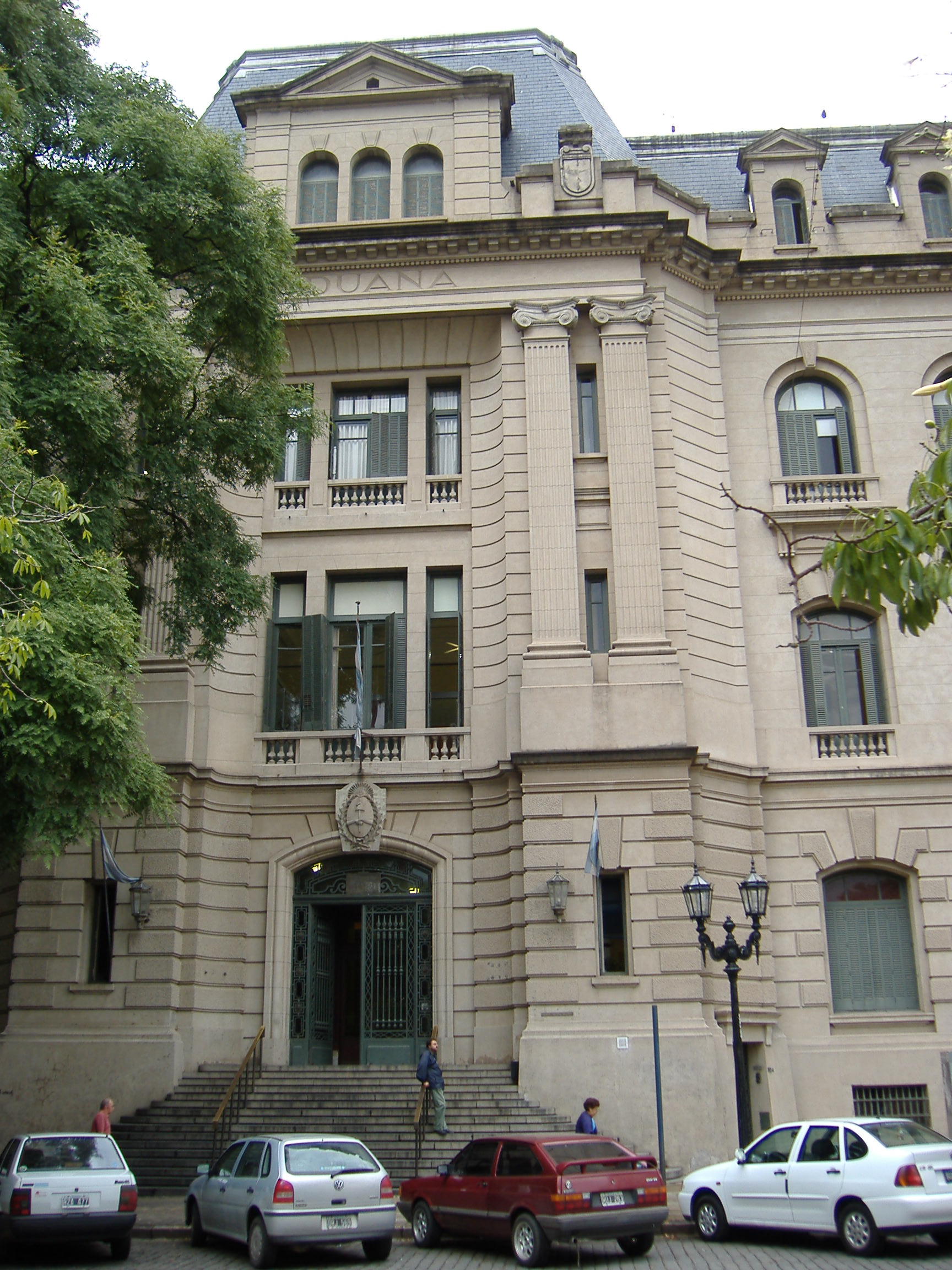
Rosario's old Customs Office, on Belgrano Avenue

The province of Santa Fe suffered greatly from the civil war that afflicted Argentina after 1820. Demographic growth was relatively slow. During this period, Rosario was a small settlement and a stop on the way from the city of Santa Fe to Buenos Aires. In 1823, it was elevated to the category of "village" (Ilustre y Fiel Villa del Rosario). Charles Darwin travelled through the area in 1832 and described Rosario as "a large town" with about 2,000 residents. In 1841, a decree of the caudillo and Governor of Buenos Aires, Juan Manuel de Rosas, banned navigation of the Paraná and Paraguay rivers to non-Argentine vessels, and thus shut off the Port of Rosario to foreign trade.

On 25 December 1851, a small group of locals and the military guard of the city declared their support for the rival caudillo Justo José de Urquiza. As a reward for their participation in the Battle of Caseros, triumphant Urquiza wrote to the governor of Santa Fe on 9 June 1852 asking for Rosario to be granted city status. Governor Domingo Crespo justified the request at the provincial legislative body, marking the geographically strategic position of the town for national and international trade, and on 5 August, Rosario was formally declared a city.

Urquiza opened up the river for free international trade. The city's economy and population expanded at an accelerated rate. By 1880, Rosario had become the first export outlet of Argentina. During the last 15 years of the 19th century, the city more than doubled its population, in part due to immigration. By 1887 it had about 50,000 inhabitants, of whom 40% were European immigrants, who brought new ideas from Europe and began to turn Rosario into a politically progressive city (contrasting with the more conservative, aristocratic Santa Fe).

During the second half of the 19th century, there was a movement promoting that the city of Rosario become the capital of the republic. Ovidio Lagos, founder of the oldest Argentine newspaper, La Capital, was one of the strongest proponents of this idea (one of the main avenues in Rosario now carries his name). Rosario was indeed declared the federal capital on three occasions, but each time the law was vetoed by the Executive Branch (once by Bartolomé Mitre and twice by Domingo Faustino Sarmiento). In 1911, the French-owned railway company Ferrocarril Rosario y Puerto Belgrano opened a line between Rosario and Puerto Belgrano, Argentina's main naval base. By 1926, Rosario had 407,000 inhabitants, 47% of them foreign, many coming from Europe in the wake of World War I.

=== Modern history ===
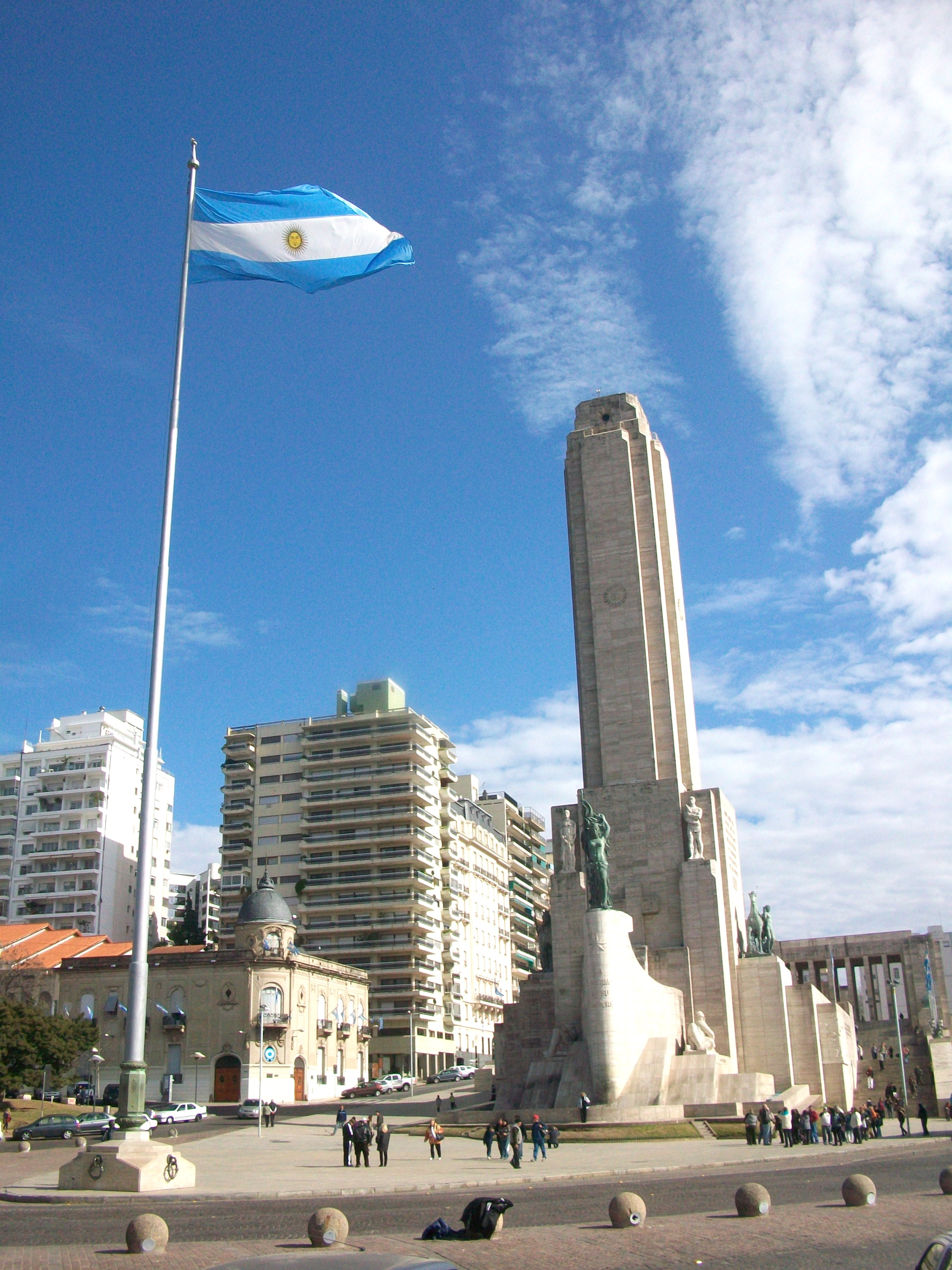
National Flag Memorial, downtown Rosario

In 1969 workers and students took to the streets and organized strikes in what has been dubbed the "Rosariazo" against the dictatorship. A few years later, in 1976, the military dictatorship made hundreds of dissident citizens "disappear" in what is known as the Dirty War.

In 1983, Argentina returned to democratic rule, but in 1989, hyperinflation caused the economic collapse of the country. In Rosario there were riots and looting episodes. Under the Menem administration, the situation worsened as the industrial sector of the city was dismantled by foreign competition, and agricultural exports stagnated. In 1995, unemployment in the area reached 21.1% and a large part of Rosario's population fell below the poverty line.

Since the recovery of the national economy that followed the 2001 collapse, Rosario's economic situation has improved. The boom in agricultural exports has caused a large increase in consumer spending and investment. The Socialist Party has won mayoral races in the city in every election since Councilman Héctor Cavallero's 1989 election. Cavallero's successor, Hermes Binner (elected in 1995), was elected Governor of Santa Fe in 2007 and became the runner-up in the 2011 presidential election on the FAP ticket. Mayor Miguel Lifschitz's administration, elected in 2007, took advantage of the economic boom to invest heavily in public works as well as in public health (which takes up about a quarter of the whole budget). Mayor Mónica Fein became, in 2011, the first Socialist woman elected mayor in Argentine history.

After the 1990s, Rosario became a major city of the illegal drug trade in Argentina, headed by a drug dealing family called "Los Monos" ("The Monkeys"). Early during 2018, it was estimated by national news sources that a turf war between local drug gangs ("Los Funes" and "Los Camino") was costing an average of one life every twenty five hours.

An ordinance approved by the Municipal Council on 27 November 2025 made the city autonomous and no longer part of Santa Fé Province. A Constitutional Convention to draft a city charter was set for 2027.

=== Historical images ===
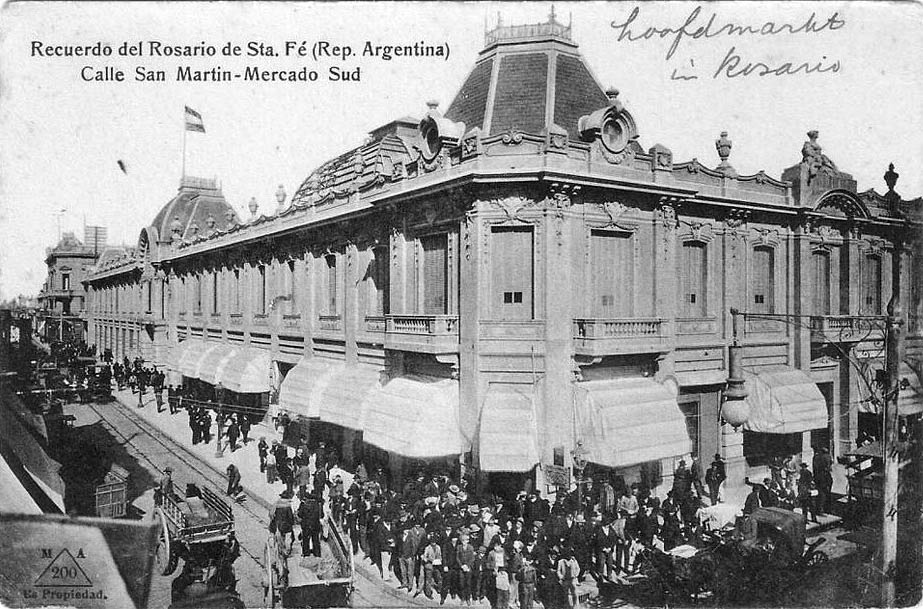
Mercado Sud (c. 1903)

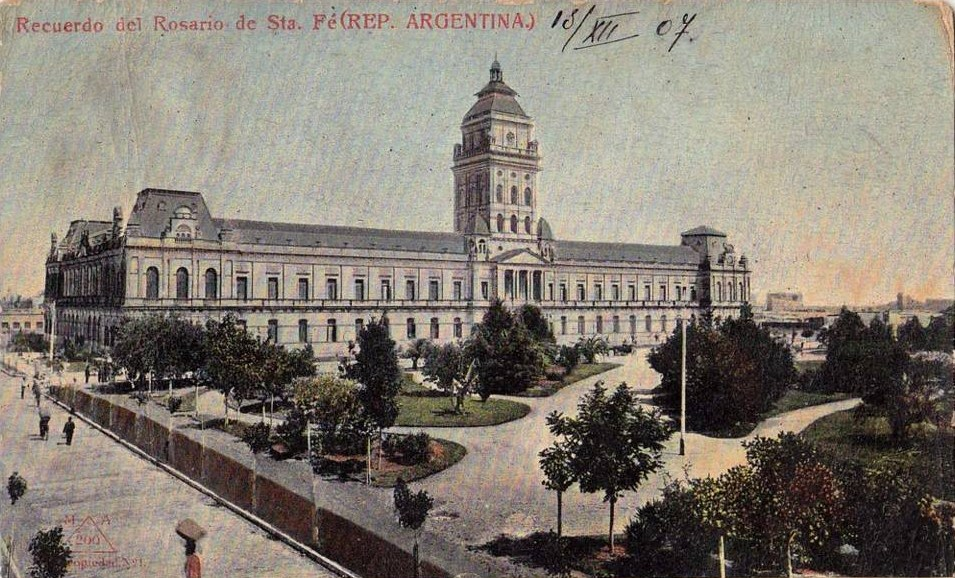
Palace of Justice (c. 1905)

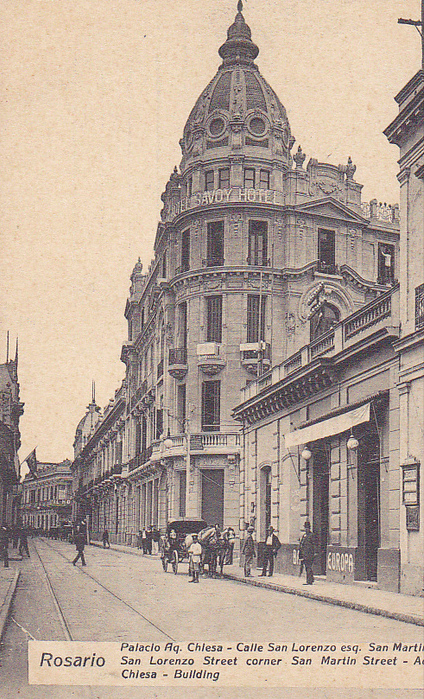
Hotel Savoy (c. 1910)

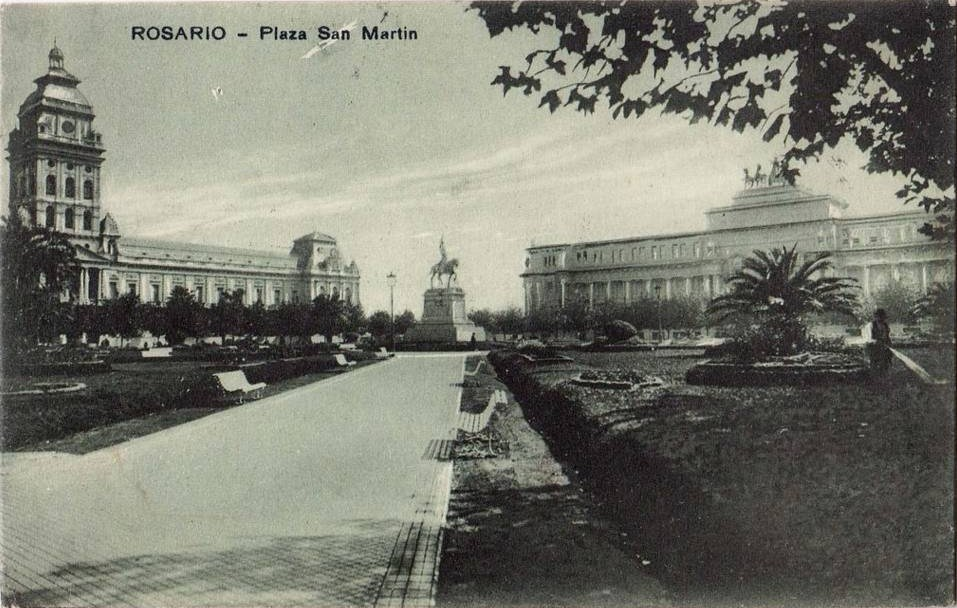
San Martín Square (c. 1920s)

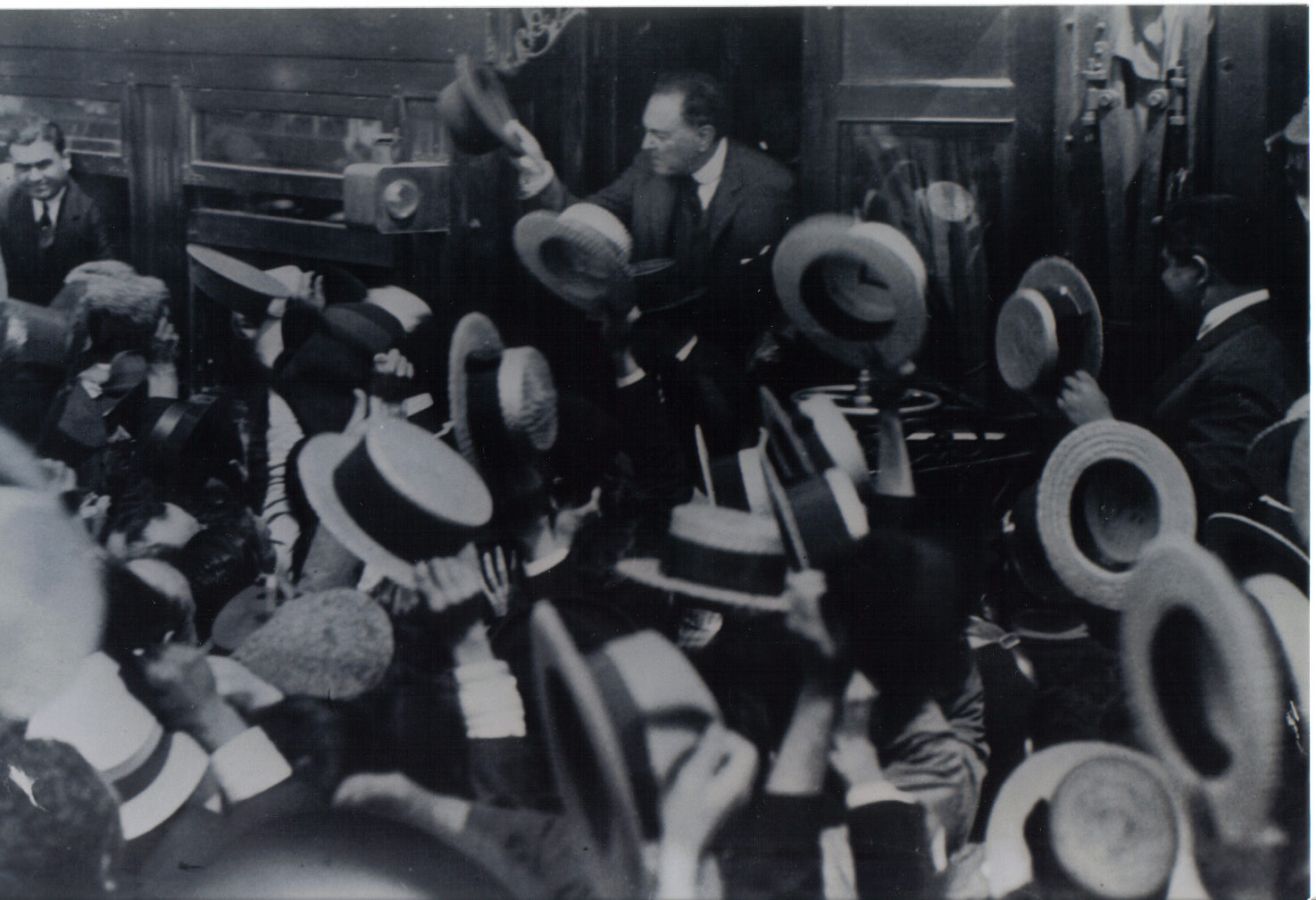
Hipólito Yrigoyen on a train during an electoral campaign (1926)

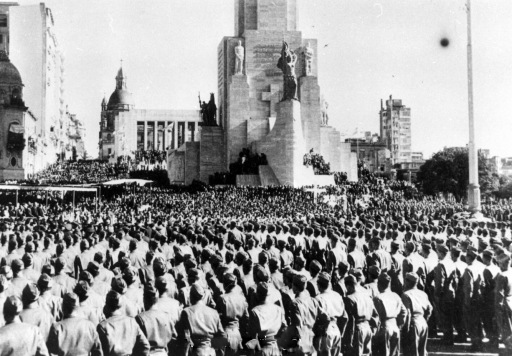
Inauguration of the National Flag Memorial (1957)

== Government ==
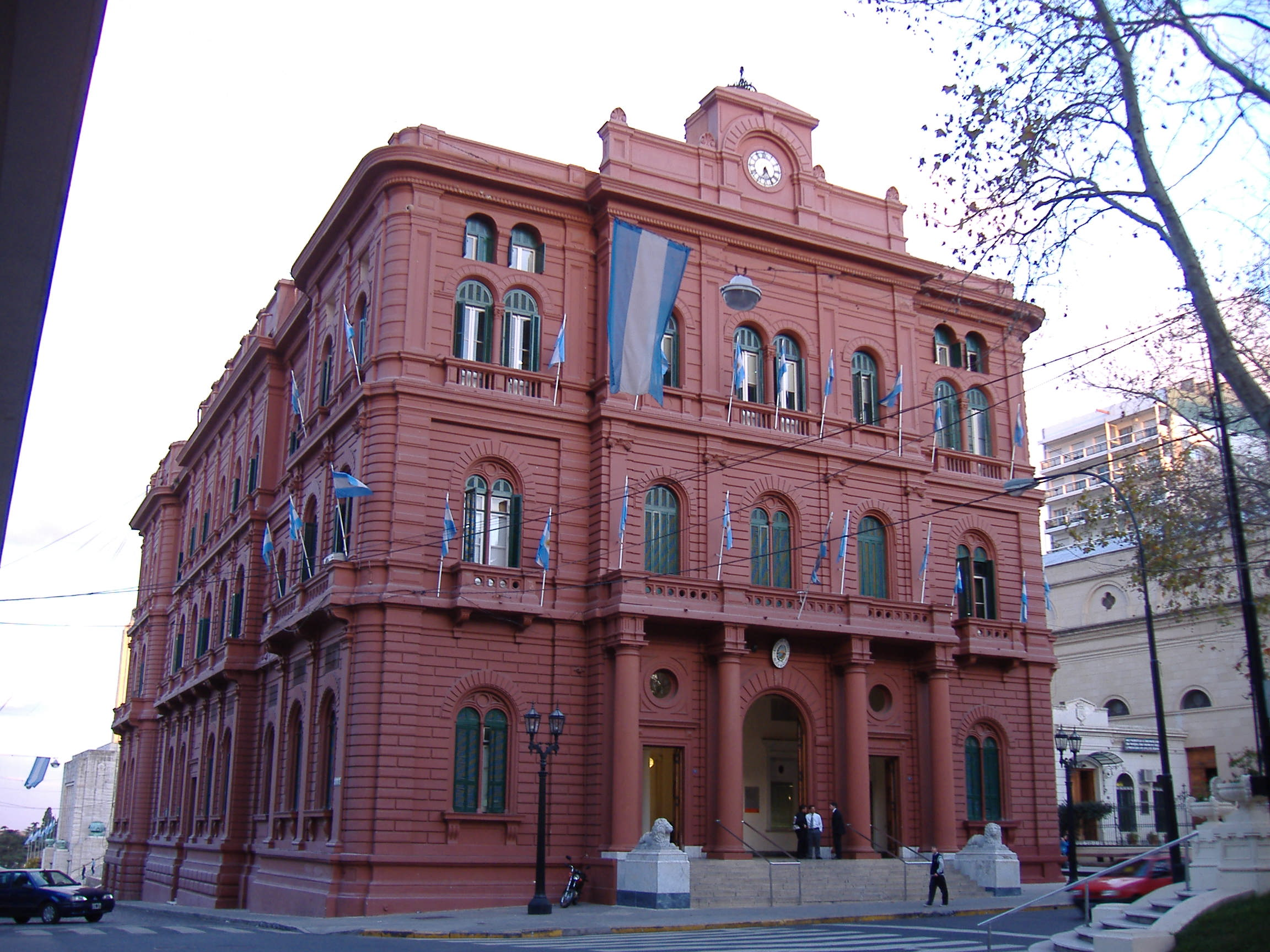
Palacio de los Leones (City Hall)

Rosario is ruled by an executive branch represented by a mayor (seat: Palacio de los Leones), and a legislative branch, consisting of a Deliberative Council (seat: Palacio Vassallo). The mayor is elected for a four-year term, and the Council renews half of its 21 members every two years.

=== Municipal Centre District (CMD) ===
Since 1997, a municipal program of decentralization of legislative activities was carried out, materialized in 6 Municipal Centres of District (Centre, North, South, West, Northwest and Southwest).

The city is divided into six large administrative districts (Center, North, Northwest, West, Southwest, and South), with Municipal District Centers that provide services to the population.

For years, local people and institutions have been pushing the provincial government to grant Rosario the status of Autonomous City. Some, with the sponsorship of the governors of Santa Fe, Entre Ríos and Córdoba as well as other important politicians, have put forward a legislative project to move the National Congress to Rosario, to decentralize the national government.

Since the return to democracy in 1983, the mayors of Rosario were Horacio Usandizaga, Héctor Cavallero (standing in for Usandizaga, then re-elected), Hermes Binner (re-elected once), Miguel Lifschitz (re-elected once), and, since December 2011 to December 2019, Mónica Fein. Currently, the mayor is Pablo Javkin, whose term lasts from December 2019 to 2023. From Cavallero on (1989), the mayor has been a member of the Socialist Party, since December 2019, Rosario's mayor is from a different political party, ending more than 30 years of socialism.

The city does not have a police force of its own (it is served by the provincial police), but in 2004 it pioneered the creation of a special patrol force of unarmed officers called Guardia Urbana Municipal ("Municipal Urban Guard"), which was later used as a model for Buenos Aires and other cities.

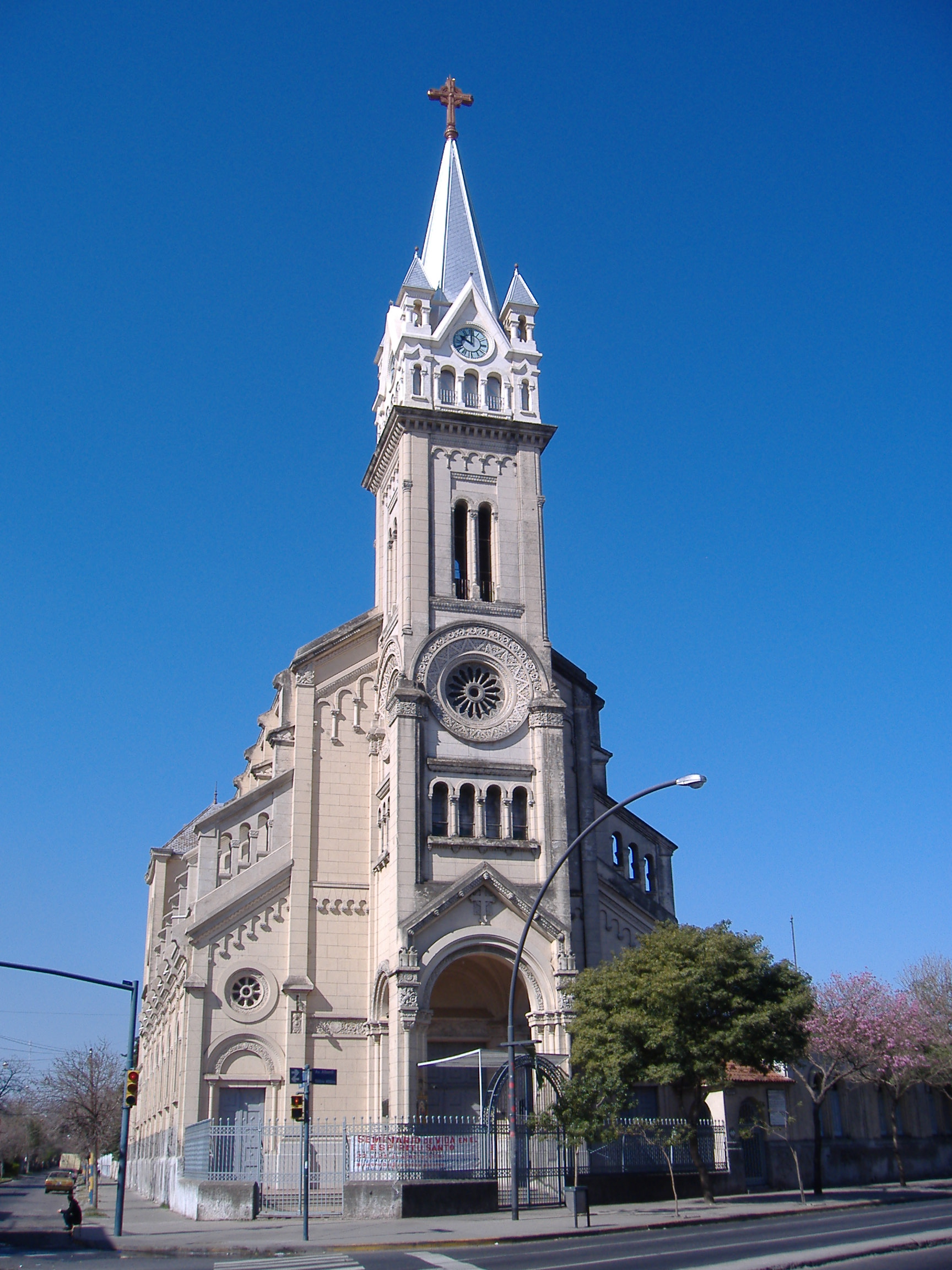
Parroquia del Perpetuo Socorro, a church at Lisandro de la Torre district

=== Municipal statistics ===
The municipality of Rosario comprises 178.69 square kilometres (69.0 sq mi), of which 117.2 km^{2} (45 sq mi) are urbanized, in 6,306 housing blocks. Of this area, 9.3 km^{2} (3.6 sq mi), 5.3% is devoted to green spaces (parks, boulevards, plazas), which gives over 10 m^{2} of green space per inhabitant.

Electric power is supplied to the whole urban area and running water reaches 97% of the population (about 350,000 homes). Natural gas is provided to 227,152 homes.

With the recovery of the national economy since 2002, the city experienced a real-estate boom. In the period 2003–2006, the construction sector added 2 million m^{2}, investing about $900 million. Despite this increased supply, both price and rent have increased sharply compared to the values during the 1990s.

According to experts, this growth was propelled by the increased purchasing power of farmers around Rosario, helped by competitive exports, and the overall preference for safer investment options.

=== Health ===
Rosario has several public health centers: five municipal hospitals (including a children's hospital and an emergency hospital/trauma center) and a municipal outpatient-only center, plus two large provincial hospitals (Hospital Provincial and Hospital Centenario), and their associated primary care centers in the city proper and its metropolitan area.

== Economy ==
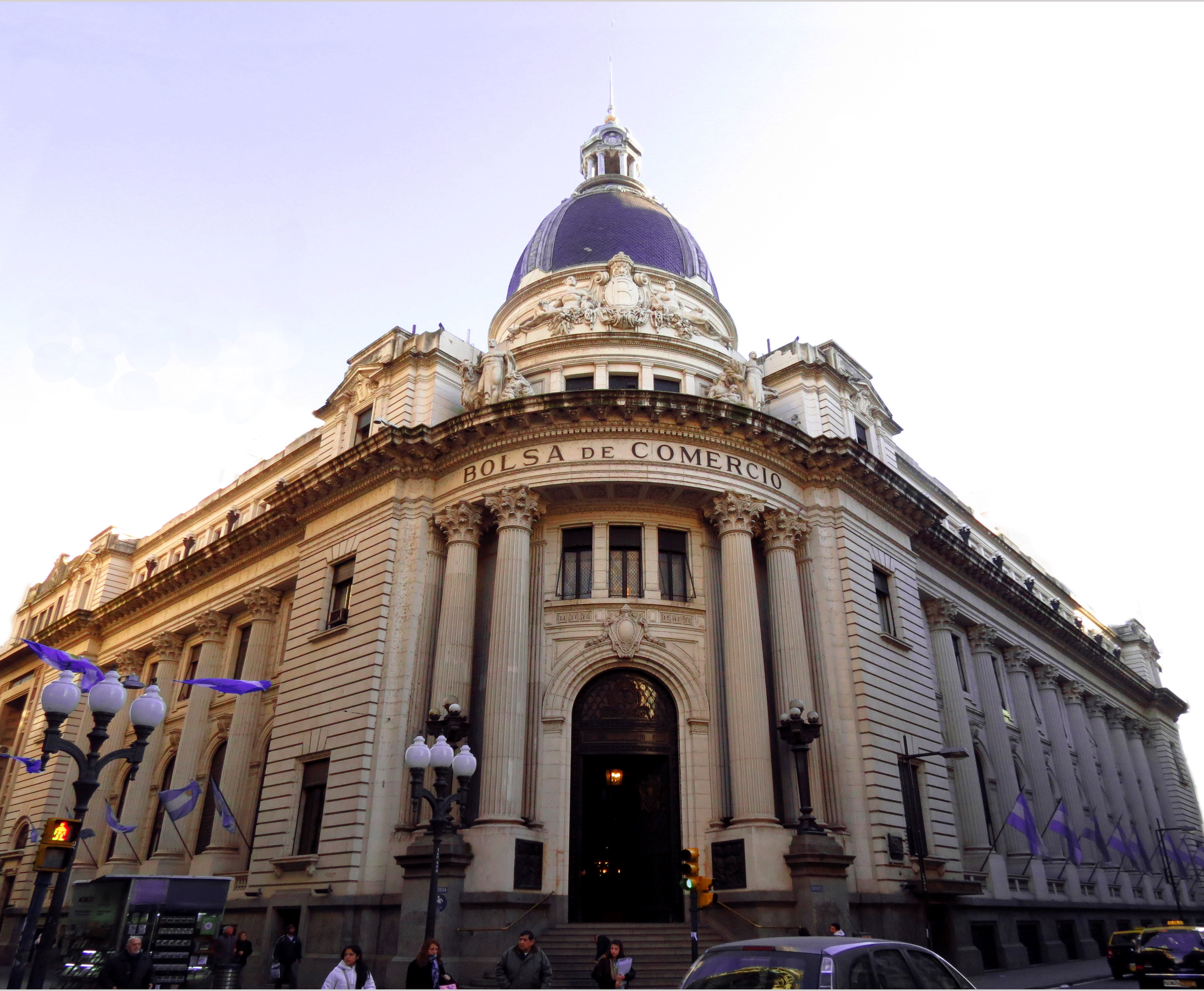
Bolsa de Comercio Rosario: The Rosario Stock Exchange

Rosario is the centre of a metropolitan region whose economy is based on services and industry, generating the second-largest urban gross regional product of Argentina, after Greater Buenos Aires. The principal manufacturing sector is the agro industry, whose industries are placed in the northern and southern areas of Greater Rosario; the investments over the last decade have transformed Rosario into one of the major vegetable oil processing areas in the world. Many other sectors contribute to the diversified industrial offerings of the city. Rosario and its metropolitan area produce 20% of the cars, 4% of the domestic refrigerators, 80% of the machinery for the food industry and 100% of the auto bodies for long-distance buses made in Argentina.

Other important sectors include the petrochemical industry, with three oil refineries located in the suburbs of San Lorenzo and Port San Martin; the chemistry sector, with plants for sulphuric acid, fertilizers, resins and other products; the cellulose industry; the meat industry; ironworks; auto parts; plants and equipment for vegetable oil; agricultural machinery; and materials and equipment for the construction industry. Worldwide international companies settled in Rosario include, among others, General Motors, Cargill, Unilever, John Deere, Petrobrás, ICI, Dow, Tenneco and Mahle.

The main financial bank at the city of Rosario is the Municipal Bank of Rosario. Its headquarters are located in the financial district, on San Martín St., and there are several additional offices throughout the city. It is focused on small and medium businesses and other organizations, especially through micro loans, and may be considered an "ethical bank."

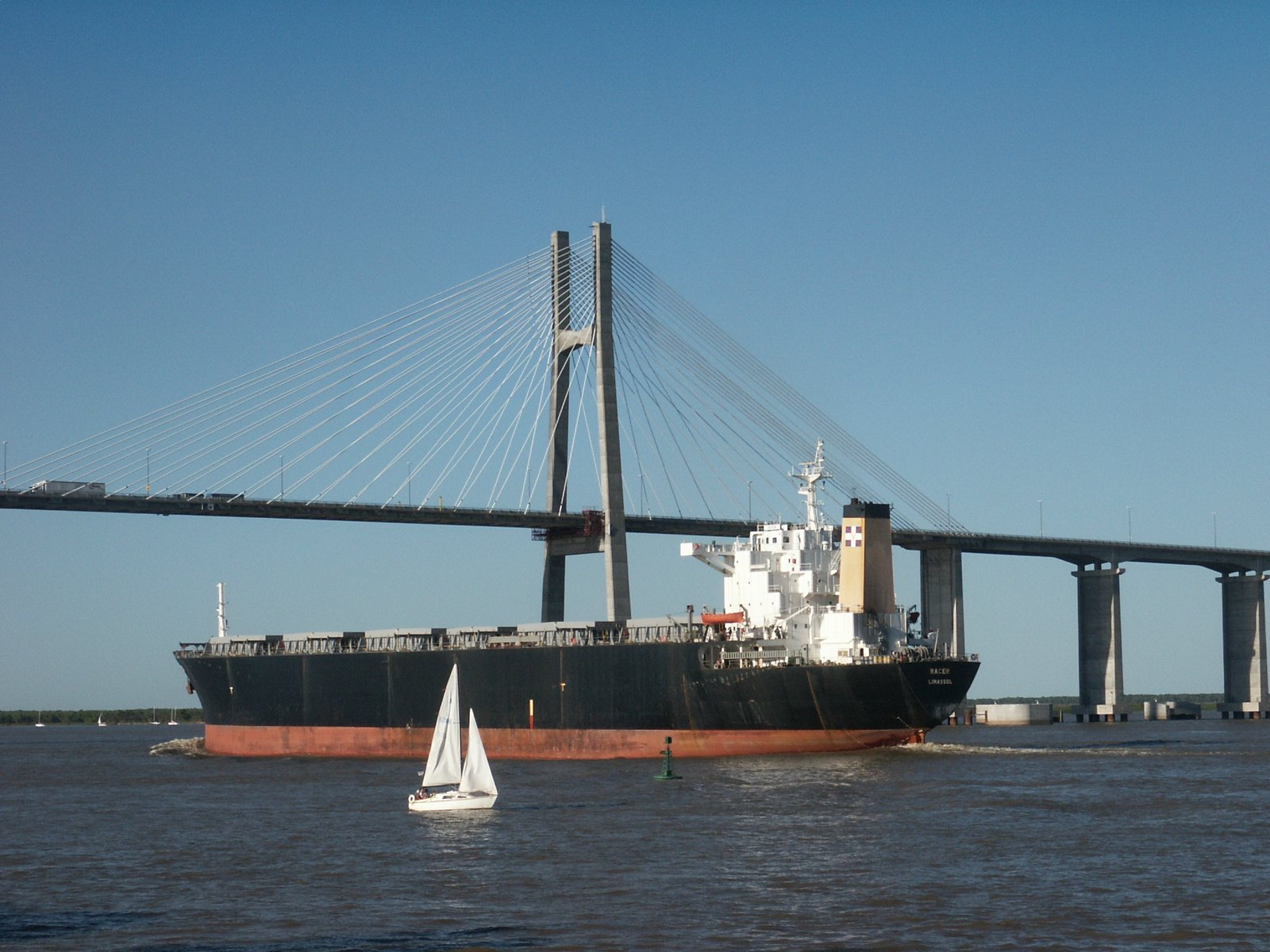
Wood chips carrier Racer on the Paraná River, just coming under the Rosario-Victoria Bridge

The Municipal Bank was founded in 1896 to support the financial needs of the citizens and small businesses in the highly productive region of southern Santa Fe Province, centered in Rosario. At the time, the city had around 92,000 inhabitants and was already the most important port on the Paraná River. The idea of creating a municipal financial institution was expressed in 1893 by Mayor Floduardo Grandoli, citing the proliferation of "centers of usury" that exploited those in need of credit, especially the poor (something not addressed by the profile of the Provincial Bank of Santa Fe, which granted loans only to demonstrably solvent persons). Acting on this, the municipal Counseling Commission passed a bill (on 1 February 1895) dictating an "Organic Charter of the Municipal Bank of Loans and Savings Accounts;" the bank opened exactly one year later.

The seat of the bank was moved in 1905. Its name was changed to its present form on 14 May 1940 by a municipal bill. Its location chaged again, for the last time, in 1986. Following some political controversy, in 2006 the bank was capitalized by the City to comply with new regulations issued by the Central Bank, and it was transformed into a joint stock company, with only 1% of the stock belonging to the City. A special clause was added, making this minimum share unchangeable, to prevent hypothetical attempts at privatization.

The Rosario Board of Trade mainly deals in cereals and oilseeds. The banking sector includes the state-owned Municipal Bank of Rosario, with branches and offices throughout the city, and the central branch of the New Bank of Santa Fe.

The largest technological center in Argentina – Polo Tecnológico Rosario (PTR) – is located in Rosario in the La Siberia site. The center focuses mainly on research and development of the three following areas: biotechnology, software development, and telecommunications. It currently employs 3,500 people, and it is expected to grow and become one of the largest in Latin America.

== Culture ==
Rosario has many cultural activities in many artistic disciplines with national and international reach. The city has produced important personalities in the fields of music, painting, philosophy, politics, poetry, literature, medicine, and law. Among the city's important theaters are El Círculo, Sala Lavardén, Broadway, Astengo Auditorium, and La Comedia. A cultural complex known as Puerto de la Música, designed by the modernist architect Oscar Niemeyer (of Brasília fame), is to be built along the banks of the Paraná River. If completed, it will be one of the largest centers for musical performance in Latin America. In 2012, after years without progress, it was put on indefinite hold due to financial constraints.

The city has several museums, including Juan B. Castagnino Fine Arts Museum, Firma y Odilo Estévez Municipal Decorative Art Museum, Dr. Julio Marc Provincial Historical Museum, City Museum, and Museum of Contemporary Art of Rosario (MACRo). The Dr. Ángel Gallardo Provincial Natural Sciences Museum was rebuilt after a fire in 2003 and re-opened at a new location in 2006. Rosario also has a public astronomy complex, located in Urquiza Park, which consists of an observatory (inaugurated in 1970) and a planetarium (1984).

The Fundación Italia is a cultural institution created in 1985 as a "cultural bond with Italy". It has organized a Neapolitan music concert, performances of Madame Butterfly and numerous talks about the present and future of Argentina. Among the people invited to give these talks were economists Domingo Cavallo and Alfonso Prat Gay, renowned scholars Beatriz Sarlo and Silvia Bleichmar, journalists Alejandro Rozitchner and Jorge Asís, filmmaker Fernando Solanas and former presidents of Chile (Ricardo Lagos), Argentina (Eduardo Duhalde), and Uruguay (Luis Alberto Lacalle Herrera).

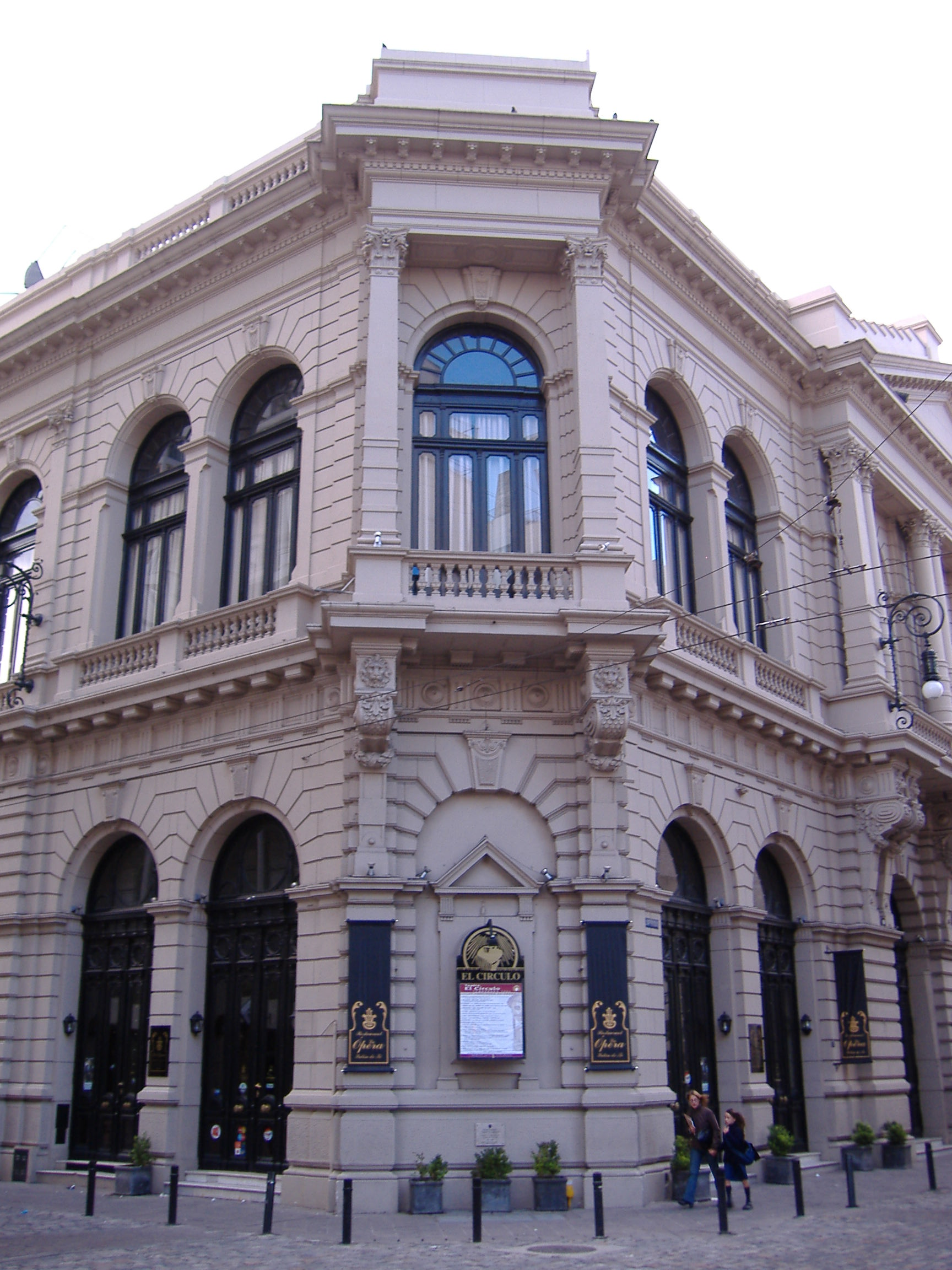
El Círculo Theatre

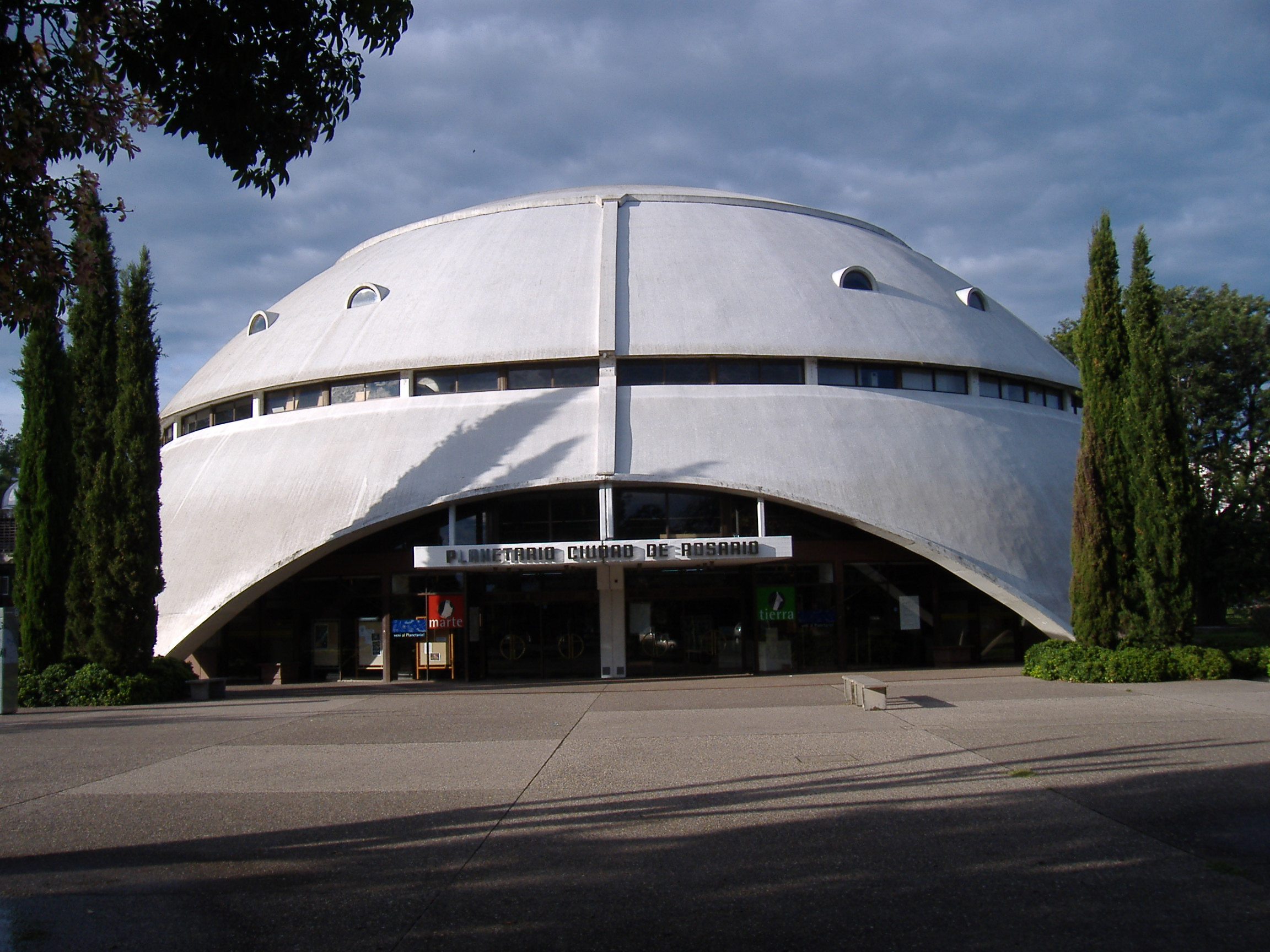
Planetarium of Rosario

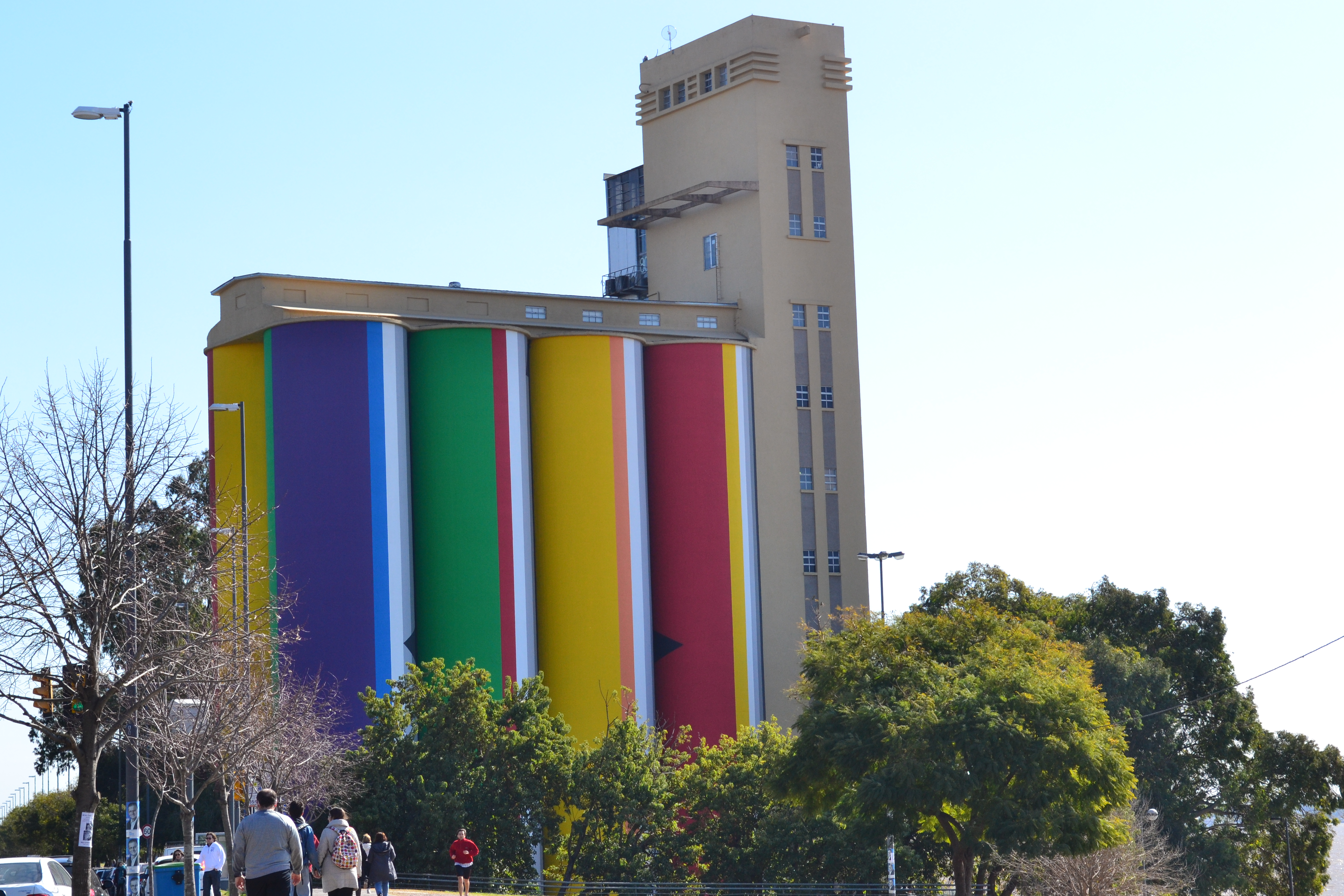
Museum of Contemporary Art of Rosario

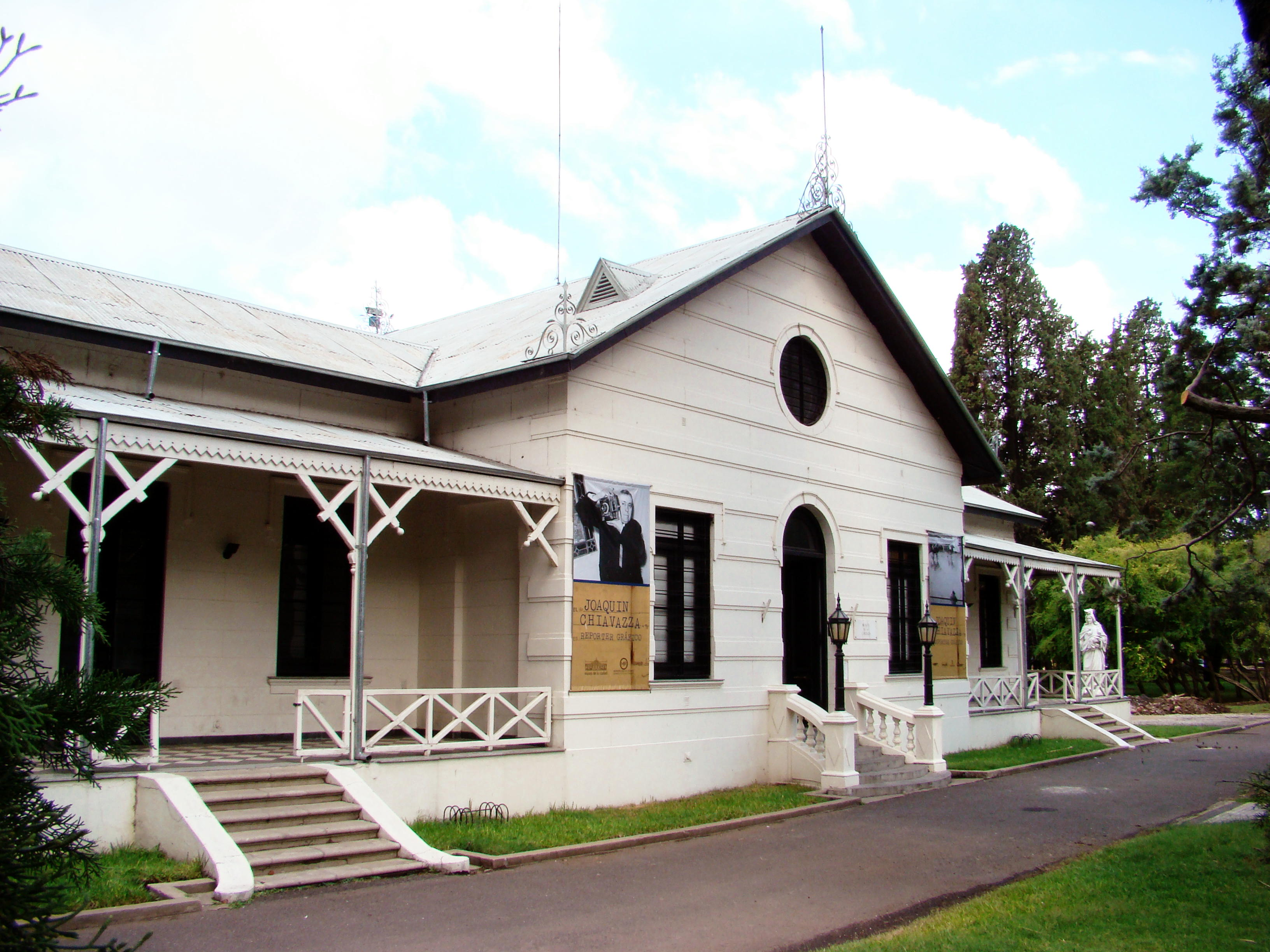
Municipal Museum of Rosario

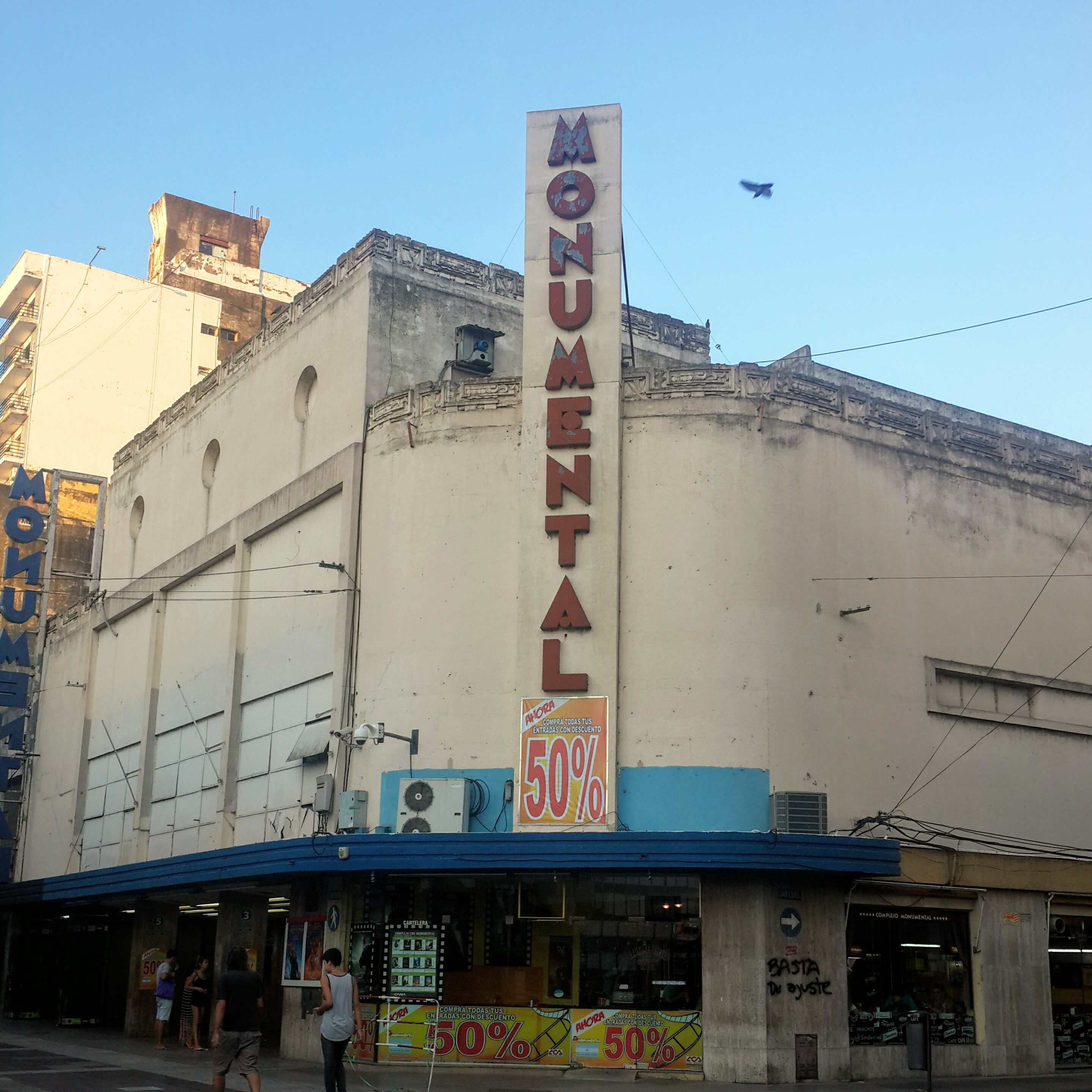
Cine Monumental

=== Cultural centers ===
- Centro Cultural Roberto Fontanarrosa
- Centro Popular de la Memoria
- Centro Cultural Islas Malvinas
- Centro Cultural Estación Provincial
- Grupo Pasajes
- Centro de Cultura & Comunicación
- Centro Cultural El Núcleo
- Centro Cultural Los Hornos

=== Theaters ===
- Teatro El Círculo
- Teatro La Comedia
- Teatro Auditorio Fundación
- Teatro Sala Lavardén
- Teatro Puerto de la Música
- Teatro Municipal Coliseo Podestá
- Anfiteatro Martín Fierro
- Teatro La Nonna
- Teatro La Hermandad del Princesa
- Sala 420
- Taller de Teatro de la UNLP
- Complejo "El Teatro"
- Teatro "La Lechuza"
- Teatro vorterix

=== Museums ===
- Dr. Julio Marc Provincial Historical Museum
- Dr. Ángel Gallardo Provincial Natural Sciences Museum
- Firma y Odilo Estévez Municipal Decorative Art Museum
- Juan B. Castagnino Fine Arts Museum
- Museo De Los Niños (In Alto Rosario shopping mall)
- Museo de Arte "Fra. Angélico"
- Municipal Museum of the City
- Museo Provincial de Bellas Artes
- Museo Municipal de Bellas Artes
- Museo de Arte "Fra. Angélico"
- Colección Dr. Emilio Azzarini
- Museo de Arte Contemporáneo de Rosario - MACRo
- Museo Histórico del Fuerte de la Ensenada de Barragán
- Museo y Archivo Dardo Rocha
- Museo Almafuerte
- Museo del Teatro Argentino
- Museo "José Juan Podestá"
- Museo de la Catedral
- Museo Internacional de Muñecos
- Museo del Automóvil – Colección Rau
- Museo del Tango Platense
- Museo Policial "Inspector Mayor Vesiroglos"
- Museo Histórico "Contralmirante Chalier" – Escuela Naval de Río Santiago
- Museo Histórico Militar "Tte. Julio A. Roca"
- Museo de la Memoria
- Complejo Astronómico Municipal

=== Cinemas ===
- Cine El Cairo
- Cinema San Martín
- Cinema 8
- Cinema Center Bautista
- Cinema Paradiso
- Cinema Rocha
- Cine Select
- Espacio INCAA
- Cine Monumental
- Cine Madre Cabrini
- Showcase Cinemas
- Hoyts Cinemas
- Village Cinemas

=== Horserace Track ===
The "Independence" Horserace Track opened on December 8 of 1901, when the first ride meeting was held. The track was located in the heart of the Parque de la Independencia and occupied a prominent place in the city's social scene. In 1919, construction began of the Popular Opinion. La Tribuna rose Partners in 1928. Moreover, it had started the construction of a new box office. In 1941, the Tribune Paddock (formerly Partners Tribune) was demolished. The final podium of professional construidaes, begun in 1972. Independence Hippodrome was the initiator in Argentina night time racing, with lighting facilities for this purpose. There's also the Jockey Club de Rosario.

Tracks

The racecourse features three tracks that are used for entertainment, vacation, and skills. The Main Track is a 1,794 metres (5,886 ft) long sand track. It is open on Mondays, Wednesdays, and Fridays for tests, and on Sundays for competitions.

Assistant Track 1 is a 1,650 m (5,413 ft) sand track, used on Tuesdays, Thursdays, Saturdays, and Sundays for tournaments and some special courses such race trots.

Assistant Track 2 is a 1,450 m (4,757 ft) land track, used to jog and tame horses.

Tribunes

- Ex-Tribune Partners: with a privileged view of the oval track and focused, this building covers 1,300 m^{2} (13,990 sq ft) and three levels, the second is a restaurant seating 150 people.
- Professional-Tribune, has a covered area of 300 m^{2} (3,229 sq ft). On the ground floor is the technical area and the Commissariat sector.
- Paddock-Tribune, has covered area of 900 m^{2} (9,688 sq ft). It has a gambling parlor and a VIP room with a buffet area for the fans. It has the office of the Administration and the boxes for journalists.

=== Libraries ===
- Biblioteca Argentina Dr. Juan Álvarez
- Biblioteca Central General José de San Martín
- Biblioteca Municipal Francisco López Merino
- Biblioteca de la Legislatura de la Provincia
- Biblioteca Pedagógica Eudoro Díaz

=== Landmarks ===
==== National Flag Memorial ====
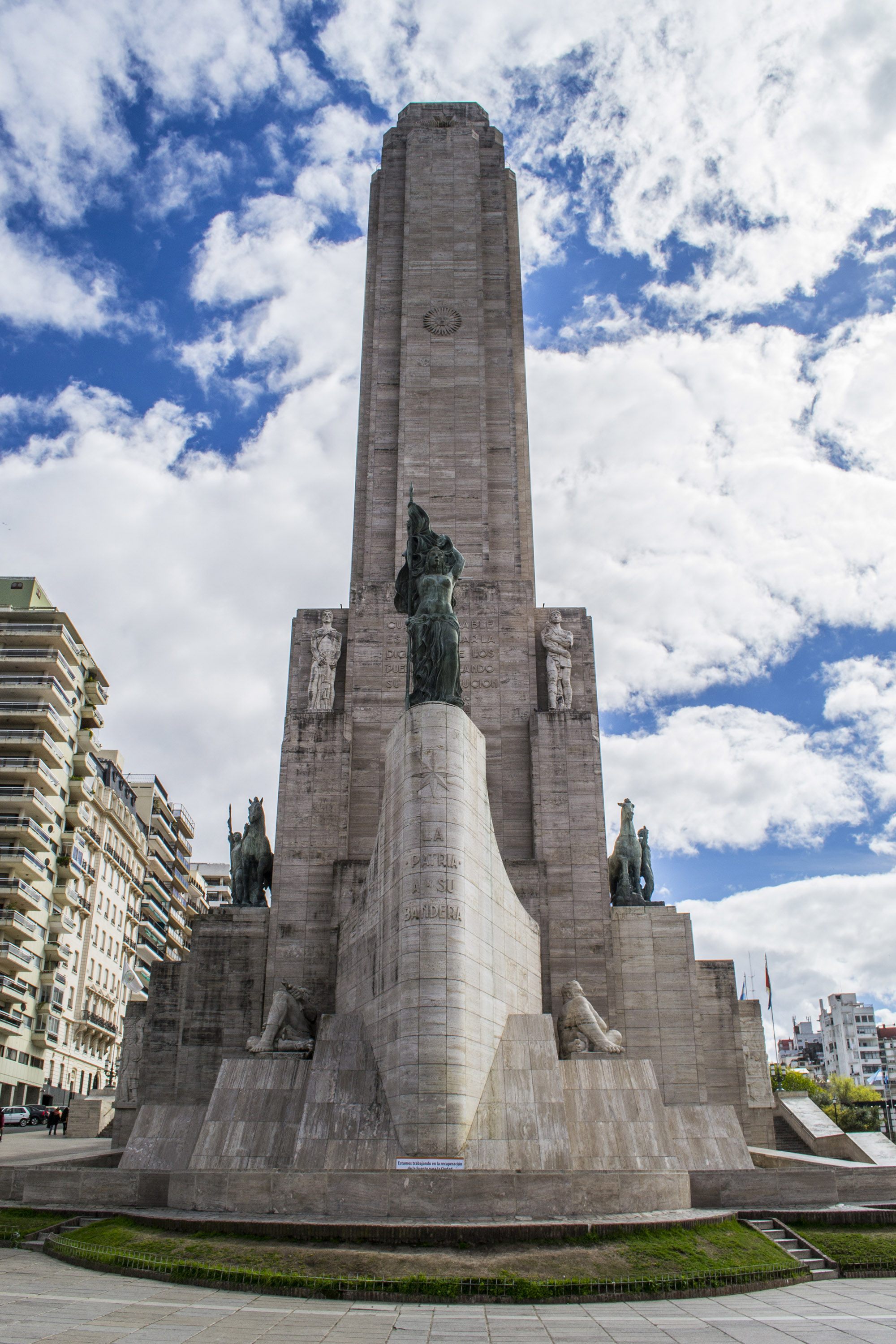
Argentine Flag Memorial

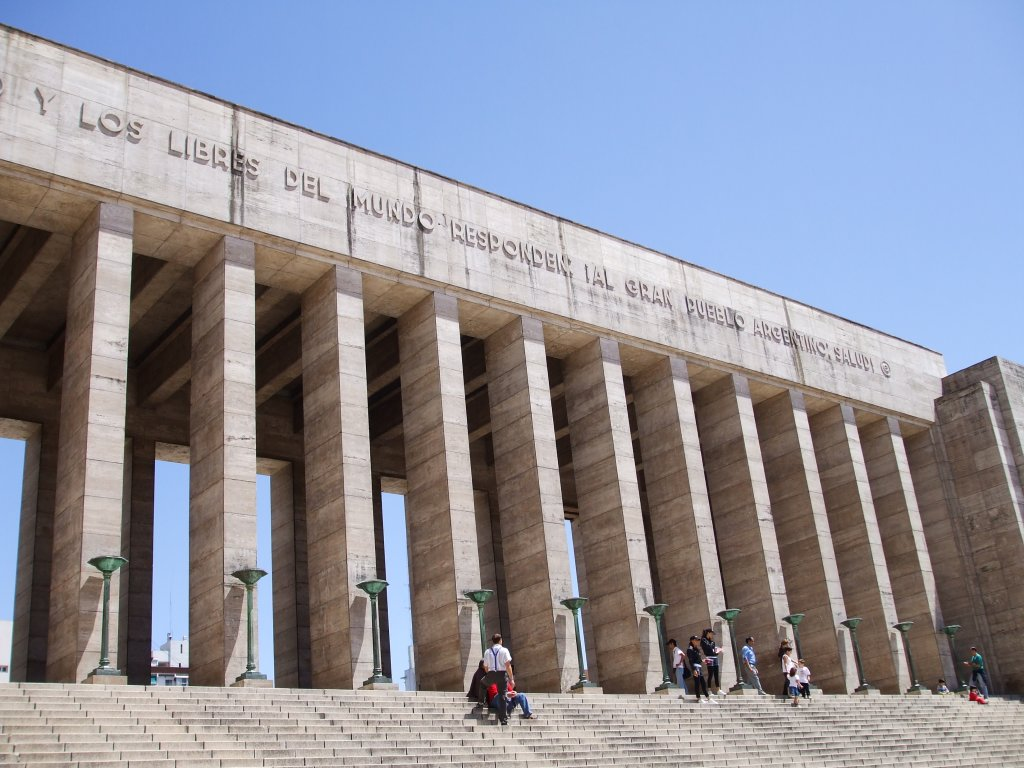
The Propylaeum (column gallery) of the National Argentine Flag Memorial

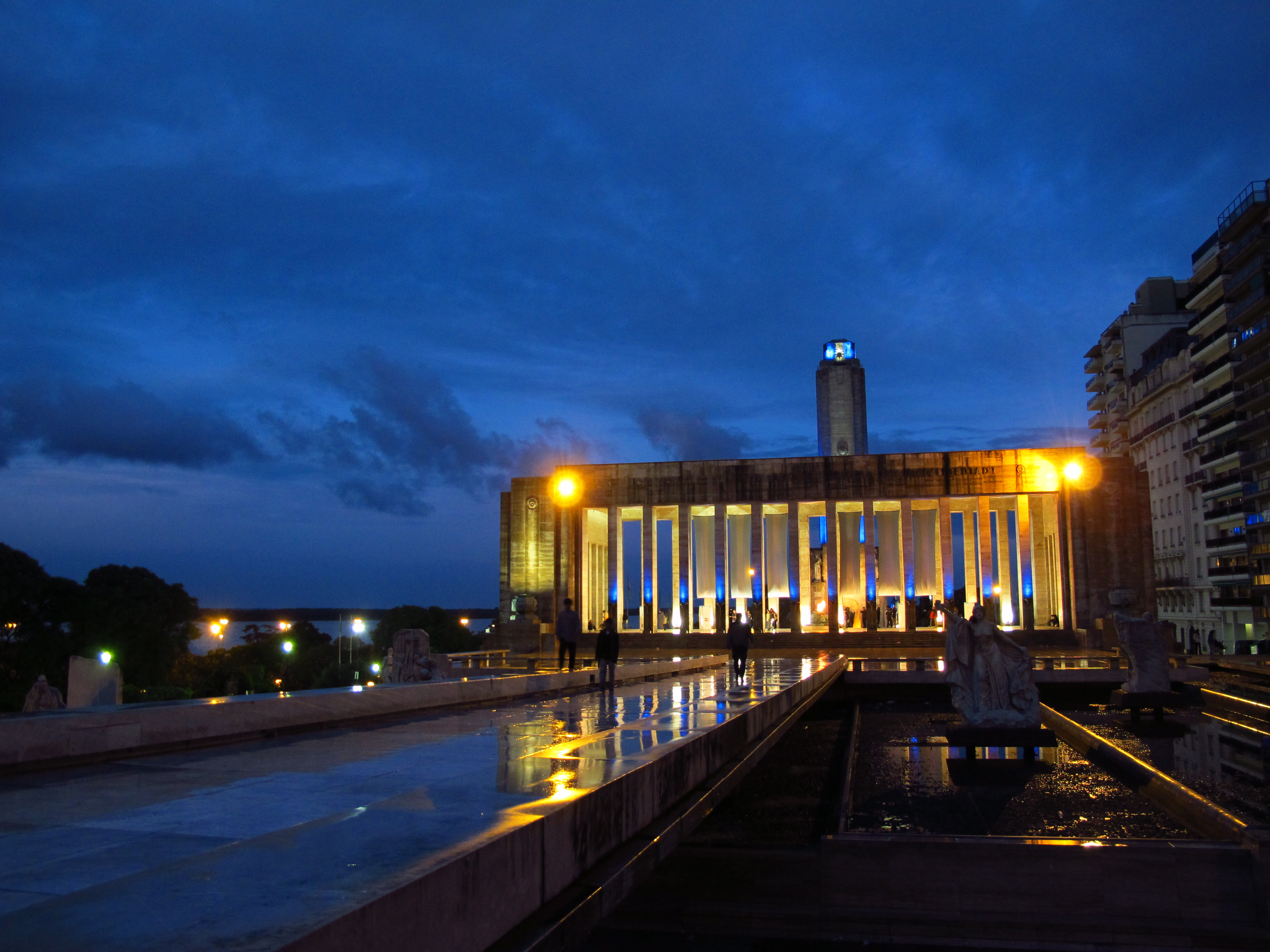
The Flag Memorial at night

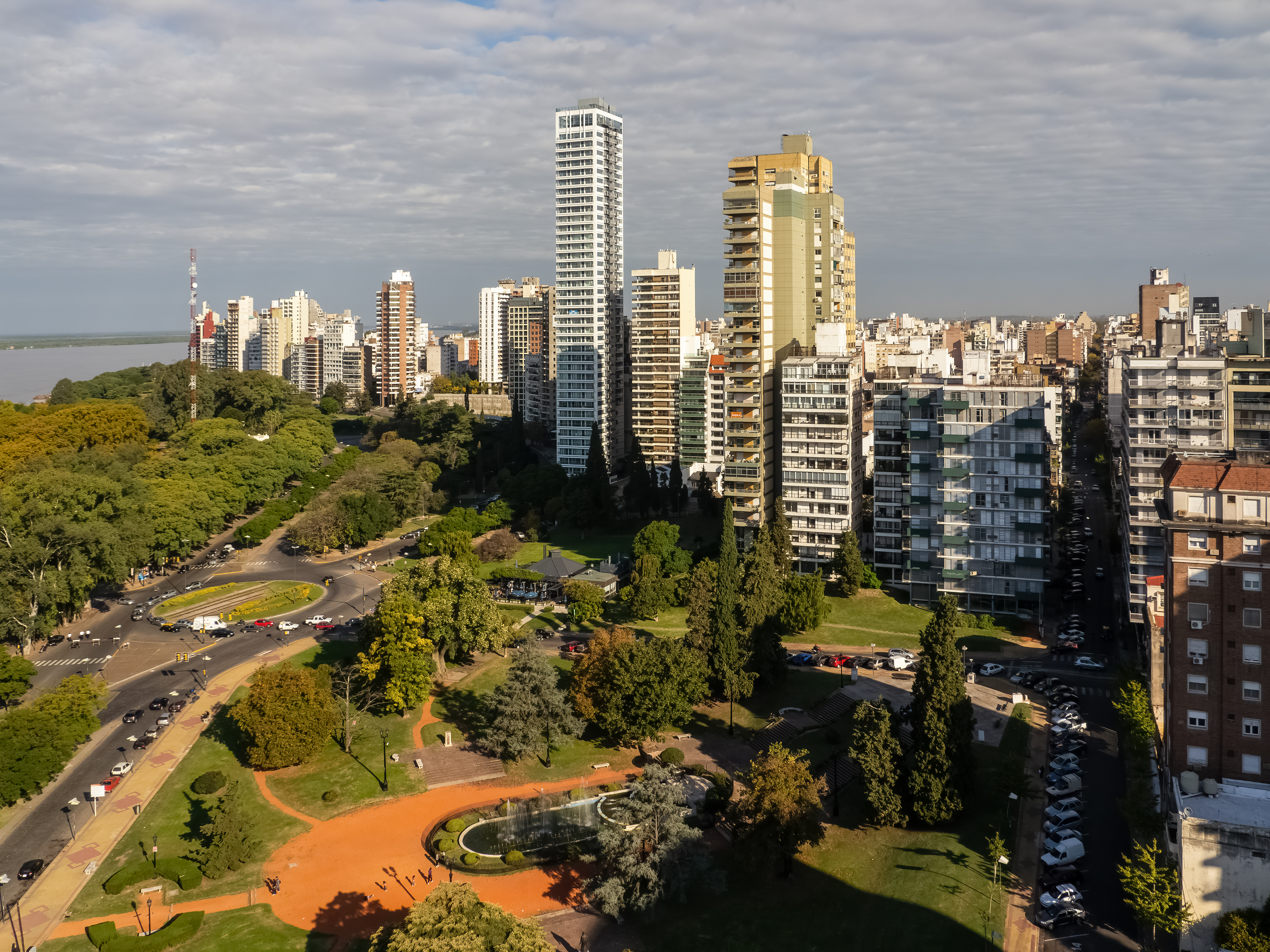
Rosario seen from the Flag Memorial

The National Flag Memorial in Rosario is a monumental complex built near the banks of the Paraná River. It was commissioned in 1944 and inaugurated on June 20, 1957 – the anniversary of the death of Manuel Belgrano, creator of the Argentine flag, who raised it for the first time on an island in the river on February 27, 1812.

The complex has a total area of about 10,000 m^{2} (107,600 sq ft) and was constructed using stone primarily sourced in the Andes. The structure was designed by the architects Ángel Guido and Alejandro Bustillo, and the monument was adorned with works by sculptors Lola Mora, Eduardo Barnes, Alfredo Bigatti, and José Fioravanti.

The Memorial (Monumento) has three parts: the Tower (Torre) or mast, 70 metres (230 ft) high, which commemorates the Revolution of May 1810 and houses Manuel Belgrano's crypt in its base; the Civic Courtyard (Patio Cívico), which symbolizes the effort of the organization of the state (the Courtyard is used for massive open-air shows), and the Triumphal Propylaeum (Propileo Triunfal), representing the nation as organized after the 1853 Constitution. Under the Propylaeum there is the Honor Room for the Flags of America (where the flags of all American nations are displayed).

The complex faces Belgrano Avenue, and is delimited by Córdoba and Santa Fe Streets, the latter of which slopes down towards the river at this point. The Propylaeum can be accessed from the pedestrian passage called Pasaje Juramento ("Oath Passage"), which starts at Buenos Aires St. between the municipal building (Palacio de los Leones) and the Cathedral, in front of Plaza 25 de Mayo (May 25 Square). Statues flank the passage by famous sculptor Lola Mora.

The Memorial and the National Flag Park located in front of it are the seat of the main celebrations of Flag Day on June 20. The 50th anniversary of the inauguration of the complex, in 2007, was marked by a special celebration and by the unveiling of a new lighting system. El Puerto de la Música will be a theater with a total capacity of 30,000 people located by the Paraná River.

Architect Oscar Niemeyer came up with the concept by expanding the show from inside the theater to a much larger outside audience. The concrete curvilinear shape building with an area of 215,278 sq ft (20,000.0 m^{2}) is the first design of Oscar Niemeyer in Argentina. The project will be a distinctive part of Rosario's skyline. Construction will begin at the end of 2010 and is expected to be completed by 2014.

==== Planetarium ====
Located in Urquiza Park, Rosario's Municipal Astronomical Complex is one of the principal astronomical centers of the region.

The planetarium has a core team, together with its secondary elements, providing an artificial image of the sky through projections made on a fixed hemispherical dome that functions as a display.

The assembly is inside the Room "Oscar Claudio Caprile", located inside the comet-shaped building.

For its technical characteristics in terms of size, quality of sound and image, and interior comfort, this room is considered among the best in the world.

The building in the shape of a comet forms a part of the complex that includes the "Prof. Victor Capolongo" observatory and the experimental science museum.

===== The observatory =====
Municipal Astronomical Observatory "Prof. Victor Capolongo" was inaugurated on June 18, 1970, and named its first director.

The Observatory facilitates outreach, teaching, and research in the field of astronomy and related sciences and informs the public of phenomena that occur in the sky, such as eclipses, planetary configurations, passages of comets, etc.

To that end, the Observatory has installed two telescopes. One Coudé refractor has a 150 mm (5.9 in) aperture and 2,250 mm (88.6 in) focal distance provided with Lyot's monochromatic filter for solar observation. Another Cassegrain reflector has 300 mm (11.8 in) aperture, constructed by the Carl Zeiss company.

There are realized observations and astronomical photography of all the visible celestial objects in Rosario's sky, according to time of year and especially the Sun, the Moon, and the planets Jupiter, Saturn, Mars, and Venus.

The asteroid 14812 Rosario was named in the city's honor as a result.

===== Experimental Science Museum =====
This museum was inaugurated on September 24, 1987. It is the first in Argentina and differs from traditional museums, in that it has equipment and instruments to demonstrate the laws of nature, which can be interactively used by the general public.

Thus, visitors of all ages can use telescopes and microscopes or experiment with lasers, sound mixers, radios of various types, computers, solar cells, etc.

To complement this, exhibit panels have photographs and explanatory texts of science and technology: mathematics and computer science, engineering, physics, astronomy, astronautics, geology, chemistry, and biology. In addition, an important area is intended for periodic samples, such as the Space Age, energy: renewable and rational use, from sand to glass, among others. The museum staff is supported by contributions from the Ministry of Science and Technology Office, the Municipality of Rosario, and the contributions made by institutions and individuals.

The museum audiovisual projections are made in the Video Sector Science, which has an area called "CIENCIANIÑO" (ChildScience) for children aged 4 to 10. The museum works in the evening, similar to the Planetarium. Educational institutions at all levels are treated in shift assignments.

==== Statue of Che Guevara ====
The 4-metre-tall bronze statue of Che Guevara was unveiled on 14 June 2008 to commemorate the 80th anniversary of his birth. It is made from 75,000 bronze keys donated by Argentines nationwide and weighs 2.7 tons. The statue was made by artist Andrés Zerneri and is the first such monument to Guevara in his native Argentina.

== Demographics ==
=== Demographic distribution ===
Historical population
Year	Pop.	±%
1858	9,785	—
1869	23,169	+136.8%
1887	50,914	+119.8%
1900	112,462	+120.9%
1910	192,278	+71.0%
1926	407,354	+111.9%
1947	584,587	+43.5%
1960	669,173	+14.5%
1970	806,942	+20.6%
1980	956,761	+18.6%
1991	1,118,905	+16.9%
2001	1,161,188	+3.8%
2010	1,193,605	+2.8%

Diagram of the Municipal Districts of Rosario: Centre District, North District, Northwest District, West District, Southwest District and South District

Rosario is located in the Province of Santa Fe, Argentina. This metropolis has a population of about 1.2 million (1,159,004 est.), thus being Argentina's third most populated urban settlement, after Córdoba. Greater Rosario comprises Rosario itself (population about 910,000) and a large area around it, spreading in all directions except eastward (because of the Paraná River). Directly to the south, it includes the city of Villa Gobernador Gálvez, with a population of about 75,000, about 10 km (6.2 mi) from Rosario city center.

To the west and south-west there are several smaller towns and cities (Funes, Roldán, Pérez, Soldini); Roldán is 23 km (14 mi) from the Rosario city centre. These settlements were incorporated into the metropolis due to their vicinity to major roads leading into Rosario, and many people living there habitually commute to Rosario.

The farthest end is to the north, following the coast of the river; from Rosario, one finds, in succession and usually merging into each other, the towns of Granadero Baigorria, Capitán Bermúdez, Fray Luis Beltrán, San Lorenzo (already in a different departamento, with a population of over 40,000), and Puerto General San Martín, the last being at a distance of 35 km (22 mi) from Rosario.

The north of the Greater Rosario is one end of an area traditionally called Cordón Industrial ("Industrial Corridor"), since it was traditionally a heavily industrialized productive region. The prelude to the economic crisis in the 1990s largely dismantled the industrial infrastructure and damaged agricultural exports. These sectors were largely revitalized by 2006 as the national economy continued to recover, but high levels of poverty and unemployment persist in the city's western neighborhoods (official surveys indicated that in 2011, 6.5% of the metro area population was under the poverty line; and that in 2012, 8.3% of the labor force was unemployed).

In 1876 the total population was 203,509; by 1926, Rosario had 407,000 inhabitants, 47% of them foreign, many having arrived from Europe in the wake of World War I. Most of these were Italian, and among them, a majority from the north-western region of Liguria.

As of the 2010 Census, there were 1,193,605 people residing in the city and 31 surrounding districts, making Greater Rosario the third-largest metro area in Argentina even as its population growth has leveled off. The population density in Rosario proper was 6,680 inhabitants per square kilometer (17,300 inhabitants/mi^{2}); but, only about 2,400/km^{2} (6,200/mi^{2}) in the suburbs.

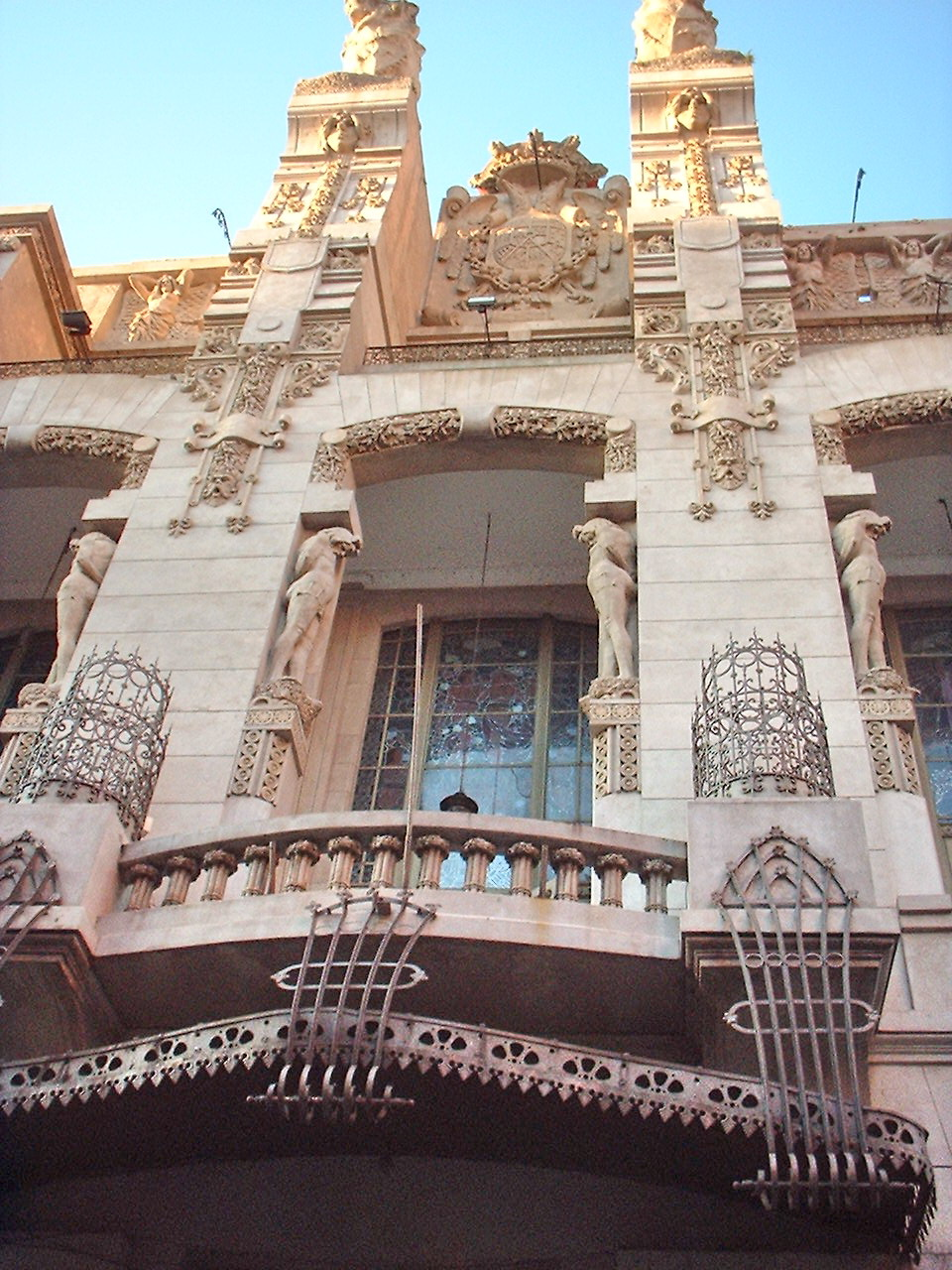
Club Español de Rosario, club of the Spanish community in Rosario

The 2010 Census also showed a relatively aged population. With 21% under the age of fifteen and 17% over sixty, the people have an age structure similar to those in many North American cities. They are, likewise, more elderly on average than Argentines as a whole (of whom 25% were under 15 and 14%, over 60).

The ethnic make-up of Rosario changed in the late 19th century, when significant numbers of European immigrants arrived in the city. Prior to this the city's population had been almost completely European-descent in ethnic origin. As Buenos Aires was the first landfall in Argentina for many migrant ships coming from Europe in the 1850s and 1890s, Rosario started to experience a diverse influx of people. The main contributors were Spain, Italy, France, Croatia, Poland, Russia, Romania, Ukraine, the Balkans (especially Greece, Serbia and Montenegro), Switzerland, Germany, United Kingdom, Ireland, and Scandinavia (especially Sweden). By the 1910s, 43 percent of the city population was non-native Argentine after immigration rates peaked.

Most immigrants, regardless of origin, settled in the city or around Greater Rosario. However, in the first stages of immigration, some formed colonies (especially agricultural colonies) in different parts of the city, often encouraged by the Argentine government and/or sponsored by private individuals and organizations.

Christianity is the dominant faith with Roman Catholicism as the most practiced, followed by Protestantism. Judaism is the second-most professed religion in the city as Rosario has one of the largest Jewish communities in Argentina. There is also a local Islamic society.

=== Districts ===
Rosario is divided into six districts, most named by location, although the easternmost is called Centre District for it includes the oldest part of the city, historically called Centro (City Centre). The data given below are from the 2001 census [INDEC].

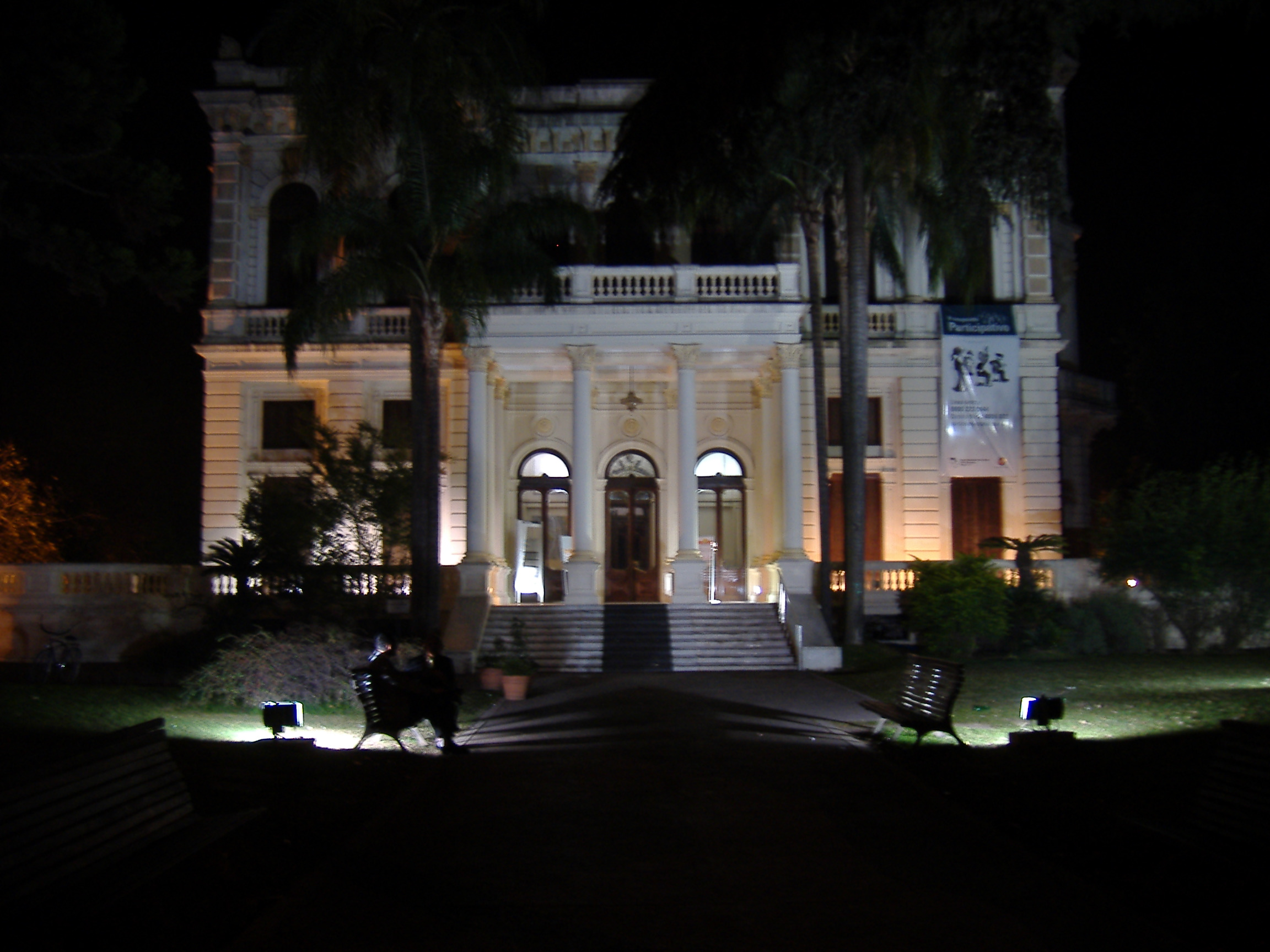
Villa Hortensia, the seat of the North District

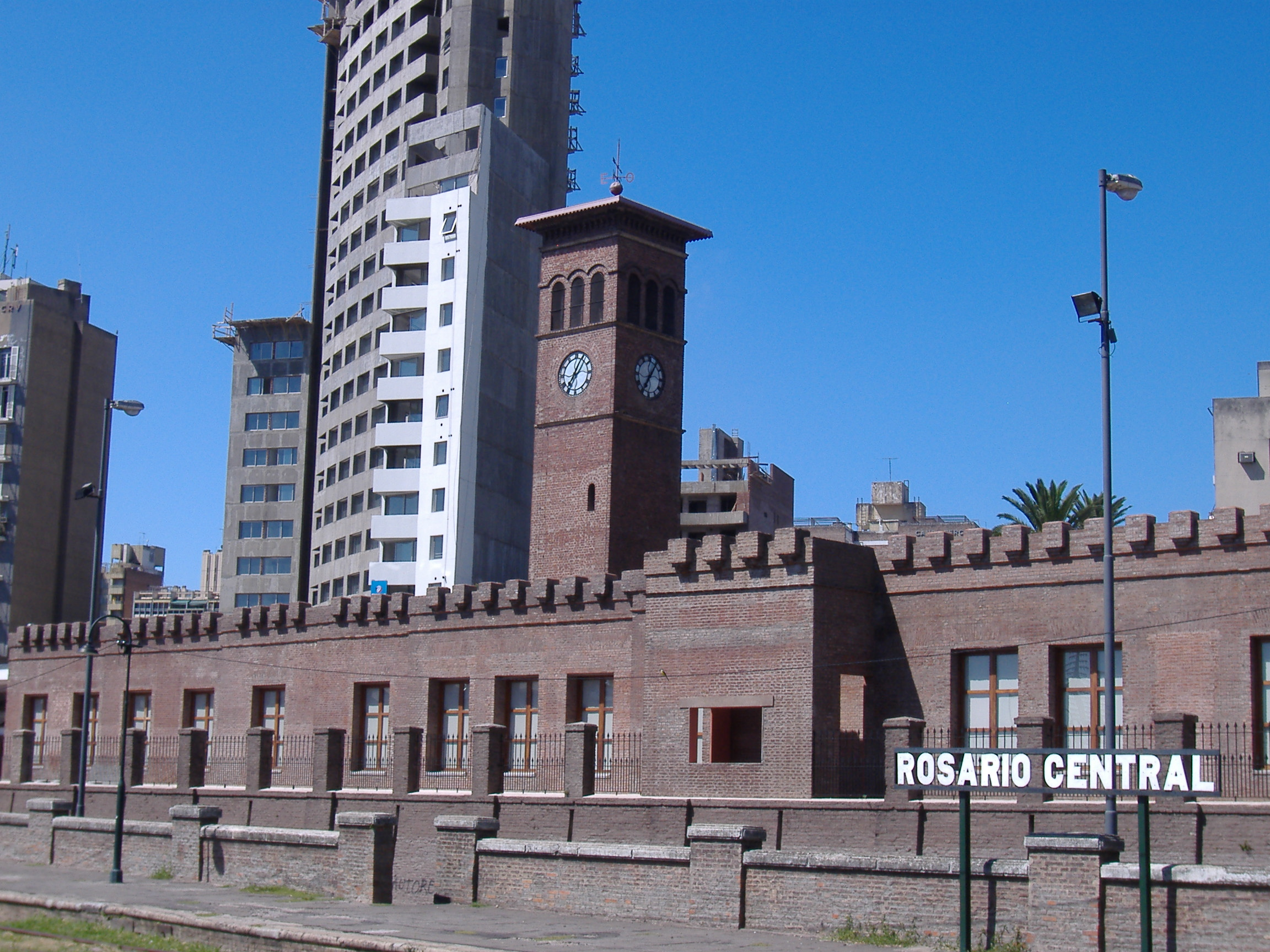
Seat of the Center District, at the former Rosario Central railway station

Centre District

Population: 261,047 Area: 20.37 km^{2} (11.45% of the city)
Population density: 12,815 inhab/km^{2} Housing: 110,152 units

North District

Population: 131,495 Area: 35.02 km^{2} (19.6% of the city)
Population density: 3,744 inhab/km^{2} Housing: 40,492 units

Northwest District

Population: 144,461 Area: 44.14 km^{2} (24.7% of the city)
Population density: 3,273 inhab/km^{2} Housing: 41,740 units

West District

Population: 106,356 Area: 40.21 km^{2} (22.5% of the city)
Population density: 2,645 inhab/km^{2} Housing: 31,625 units

Southwest District

Population: 103,446 Area: 20.19 km^{2} (11.3% of the city)
Population density: 5,123 inhab/km^{2} Housing: 28,284 units

South District

Population: 160,771 Area: 18.76 km^{2} (10.5% of the city)
Population density: 8,569 inhab/km^{2} Housing: 48,541 units

== Urban structure ==
=== Centre District ===
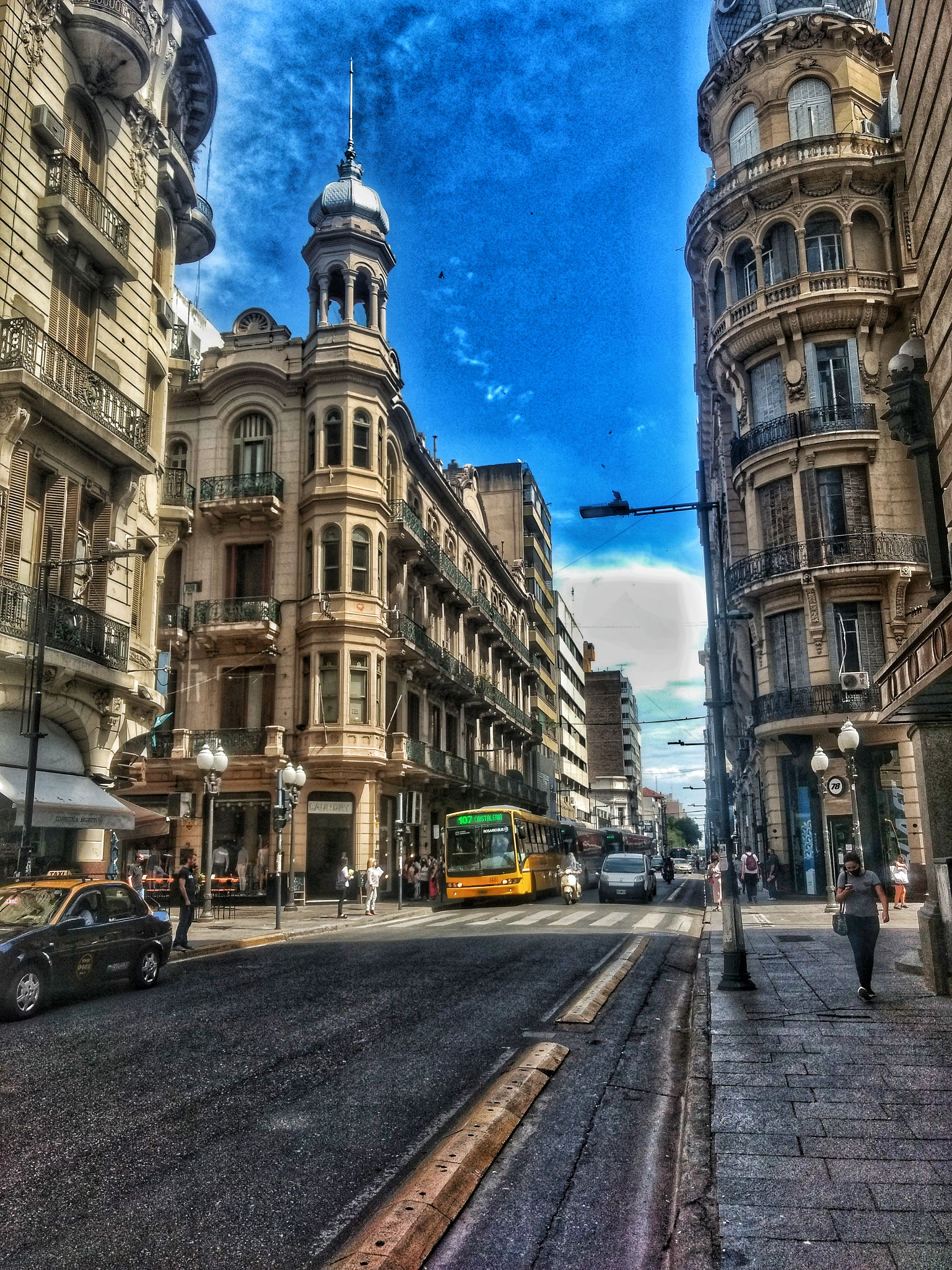
Downtown Rosario has many bars and cafés.

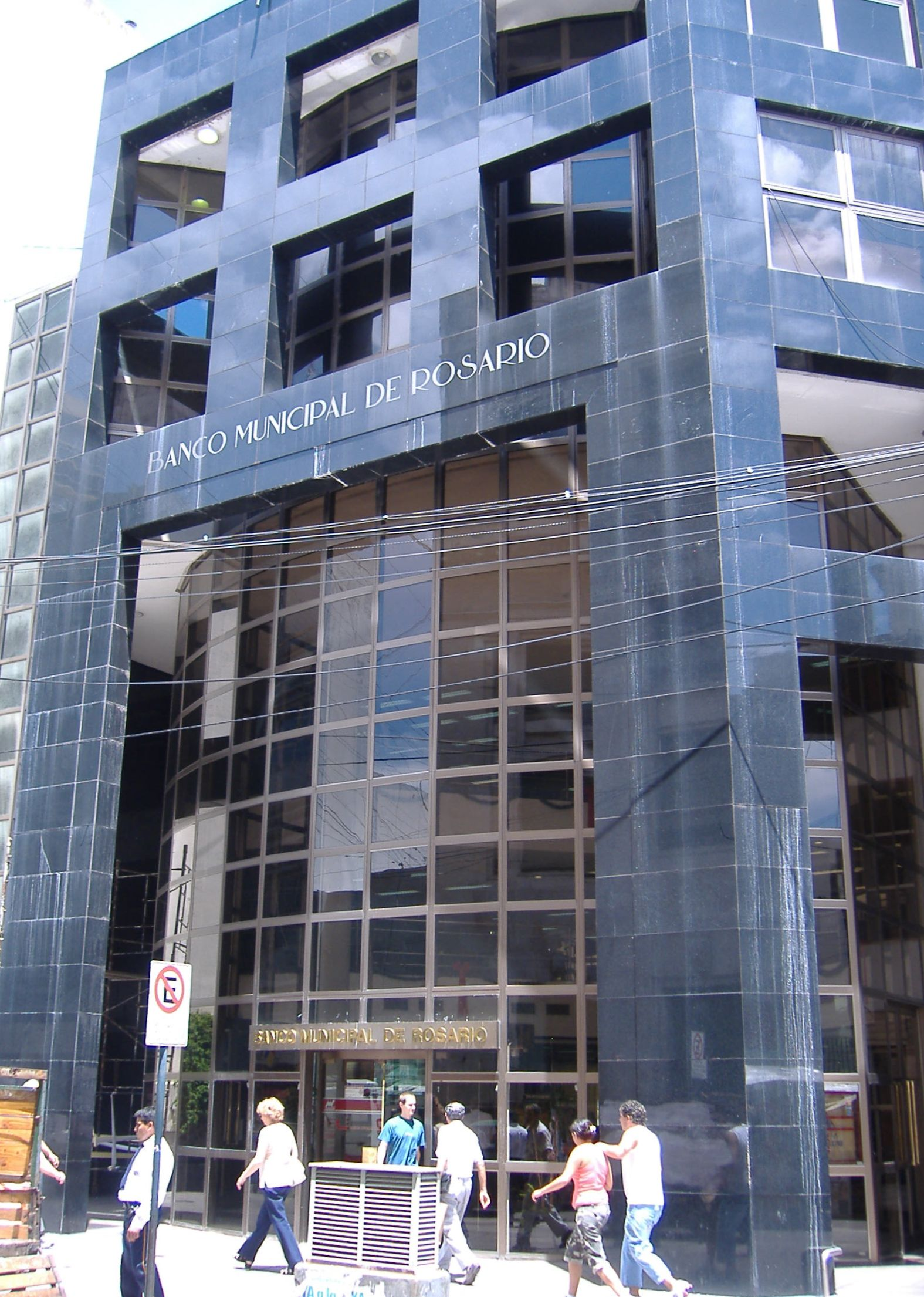
The central offices of the Municipal Bank of Rosario, as pictured in 2006

At Rosario city center, Córdoba Street is the main avenue. It begins at the Flag Memorial Park, climbs towards the district area, and becomes a pedestrian walk for seven blocks, between Plaza 25 de Mayo and Plaza Pringles. Along Córdoba Ave to the west Paseo del Siglo ("Walk of the Century") was settled, with former houses of wealthy families, finally there is also the San Martín Square, and elsewhere, Plaza Montenegro (on Peatonal San Martín, the pedestrian-only four blocks of San Martín Street) and Plaza Sarmiento.

Oroño Boulevard (going north–south) and Pellegrini Avenue (east-west) mark the boundaries of the town center together with the river. At their confluence starts the Parque de la Independencia, that houses the Juan B. Castagnino Fine Arts Museum, the Newell's Old Boys football club, and the sports clubs Provincial and Gimnasia y Esgrima, as well as the horse racetrack and the former Sociedad Rural (Rural Society).

Towards the south, beyond Pellegrini Avenue, there are two more boulevards, 27 de Febrero and Seguí, and avenues Uriburu, Arijón and Battle y Ordóñez. To the west, after Oroño, there are the avenues Ovidio Lagos and Francia, Avellaneda Boulevard and Provincias Unidas Avenue. The main barrios in the south are La Tablada, Parque Casado, Las Heras, Las Delicias and Las Flores. The city ends in the Saladillo Stream.

Among the districts in the west are Echesortu, Belgrano, Triángulo, Moderno, Godoy and Fisherton. To the north-east there lie Pichincha, Ludueña, Lisandro de la Torre (home of Rosario Central's stadium) and Empalme Graneros.

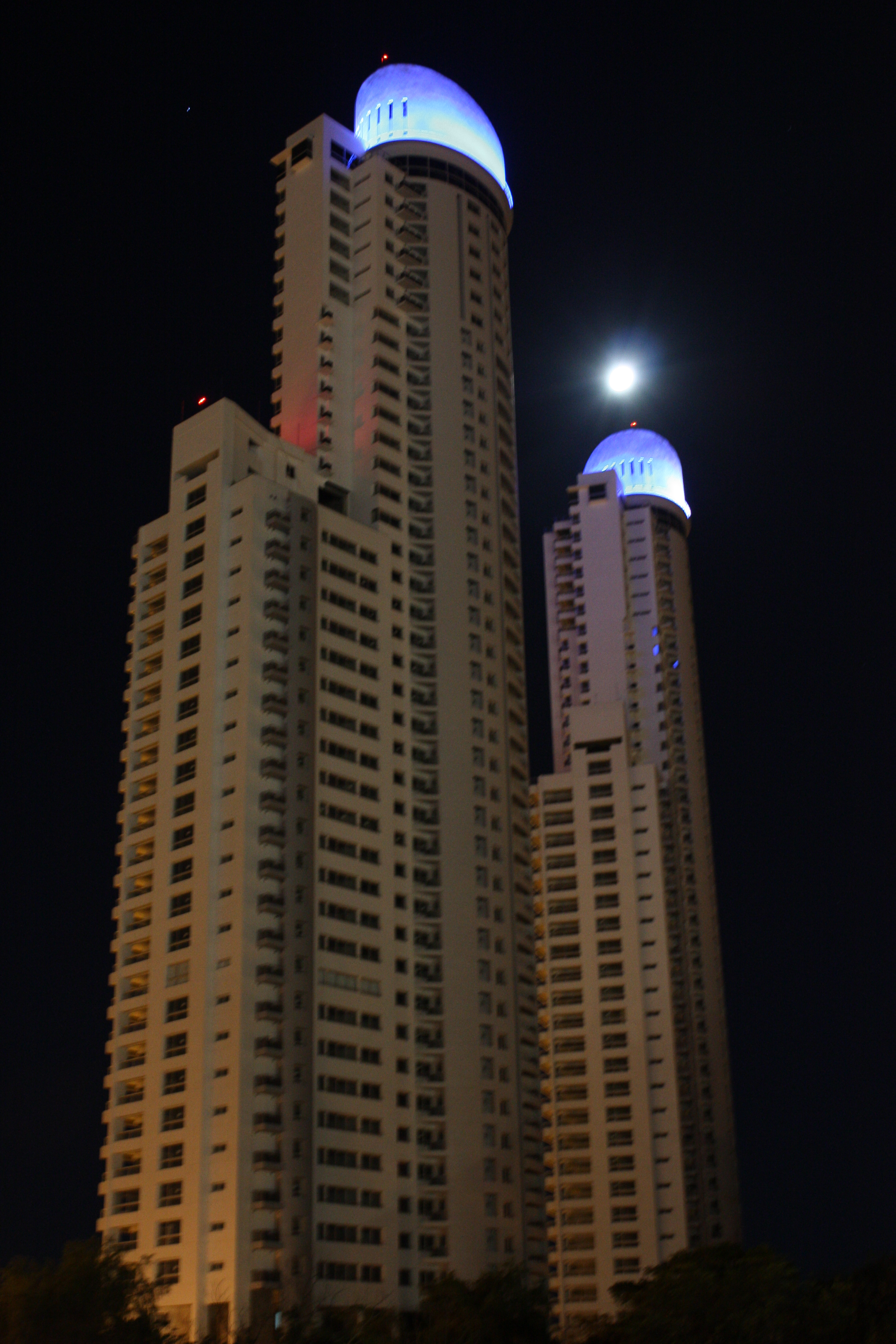
Night view of the luxury Dolfines Guaraní Towers, May 2010

Next to the stadium, there is the Parque Alem, and nearby the Sorrento thermal power plant. To the north lie the districts of Alberdi, La Florida (with a popular beach resort of the same name), Parque Field (built under US President John F. Kennedy's Alliance for Progress development plans) and Rucci. The main streets are Alberdi Avenue and its continuation, Rondeau Boulevard (which leads to the Rosario-Victoria Bridge and the city of Granadero Baigorria). These are crossed by the avenues Las Tres Vías, Génova, Sorrento, and Puccio.

An important part of Rosario's urban character is its riverbank. The city recovered the riverbank of the Paraná not long ago, thanks to a reorganization of terrains formerly owned by the port and the national railroad system. Going from the center immediately north of the port, the riverbank is surrounded by a large number of parks; Argentine flag Memorial, Parque de España, Parque de las Colectividades and Parque Sunchales.

=== Greater Rosario ===
Through the years, Rosario has spread in all directions. Towards the south, beyond Pellegrini, there are two more boulevards, 27 de Febrero and Seguí, and avenues Uriburu, Arijón and Battle y Ordóñez.To the west, after Oroño, there are the avenues Ovidio Lagos and Francia, Avellaneda Boulevard and Provincias Unidas Avenue. The main neighborhoods in the south are La Tablada, Parque Casado, Las Heras, Las Delicias and Las Flores. The city ends in the Saladillo Stream (the natural border with Villa Gobernador Gálvez). This is just south of the great barrio Grandoli.

Among the neighborhoods in the west are Echesortu, Belgrano, Triángulo, Moderno, Godoy, and Fisherton (near the west end of the city, formerly the home of hierarchical personnel of English railroad companies established in Rosario). To the north-east there lie the neighborhoods of Pichincha (a red-light district in the early 20th century, now home to an open-air antiquities fair: Mercado de antigüedades "Feria Retro La Huella"), Ludueña, Lisandro de la Torre (home of the Rosario Central football club) and Empalme Graneros; these last three are in the influence area of the Ludueña Stream, now contained by underground piping, but until the 1980s a source of floods.

Next to the Rosario Central stadium, there is a large park, Parque Alem, and not far from it, there stands the Sorrento thermoelectric power plant. North of the Lisandro de la Torre neighborhood, there are Alberdi (formerly an independent town), La Florida (with a popular beach resort of the same name), and Rucci.

The main streets in the north are Alberdi Avenue and its continuation, Rondeau Boulevard (which leads to the north exit of the city, the access to the Rosario-Victoria Bridge, and the town of Granadero Baigorria). These major arteries are crossed by several avenues: Las Tres Vías, Génova, Sorrento, and Puccio.

== Transportation ==
Rosario's strategic location is destined to become a significant transportation hub and as the bi-oceanic corridor that links the State of Rio Grande do Sul (Brazil), an important component in global distribution and the core center of a key corridor in the Mercosur, the Common Market for the South.

The average amount of time people spend commuting with public transit in Rosario, for example to and from work, on a weekday is 50 min. 9% of public transit riders, ride for more than 2 hours every day. The average amount of time people wait at a stop or station for public transit is 14 min, while 19% of riders wait for over 20 minutes on average every day. The average distance people usually ride in a single trip with public transit is 4.3 km, while 4% travel for over 12 km in a single direction.

=== Road transport ===
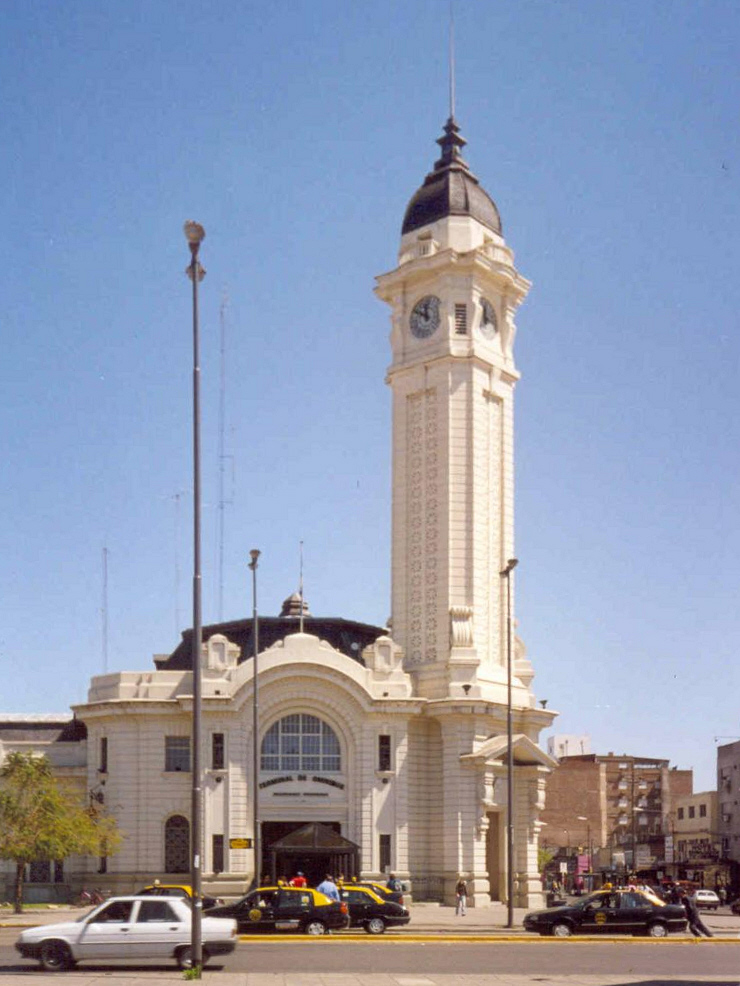
Front entrance and clock tower of the Mariano Moreno Bus Terminal in Rosario

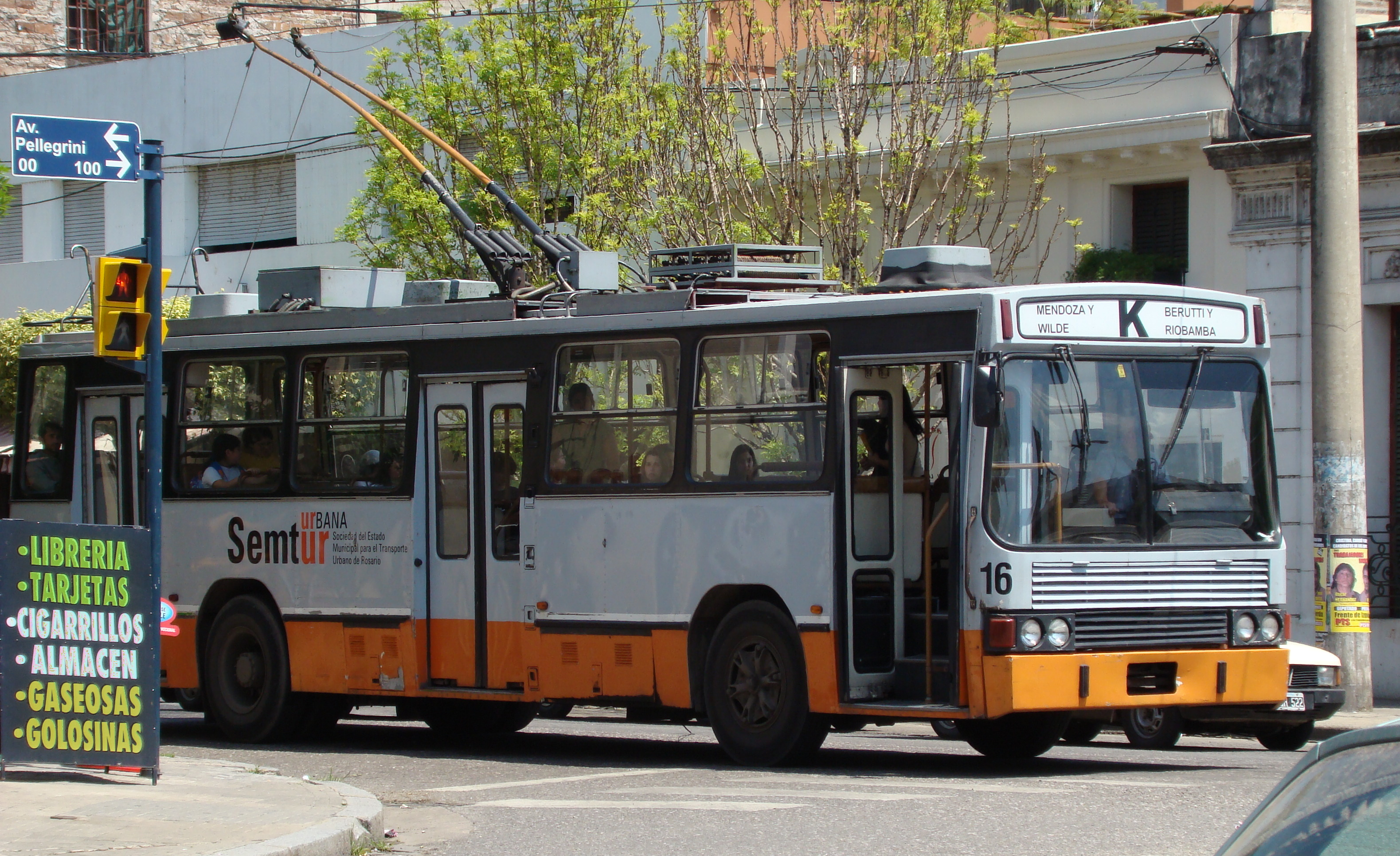
Trolleybus in the city centre

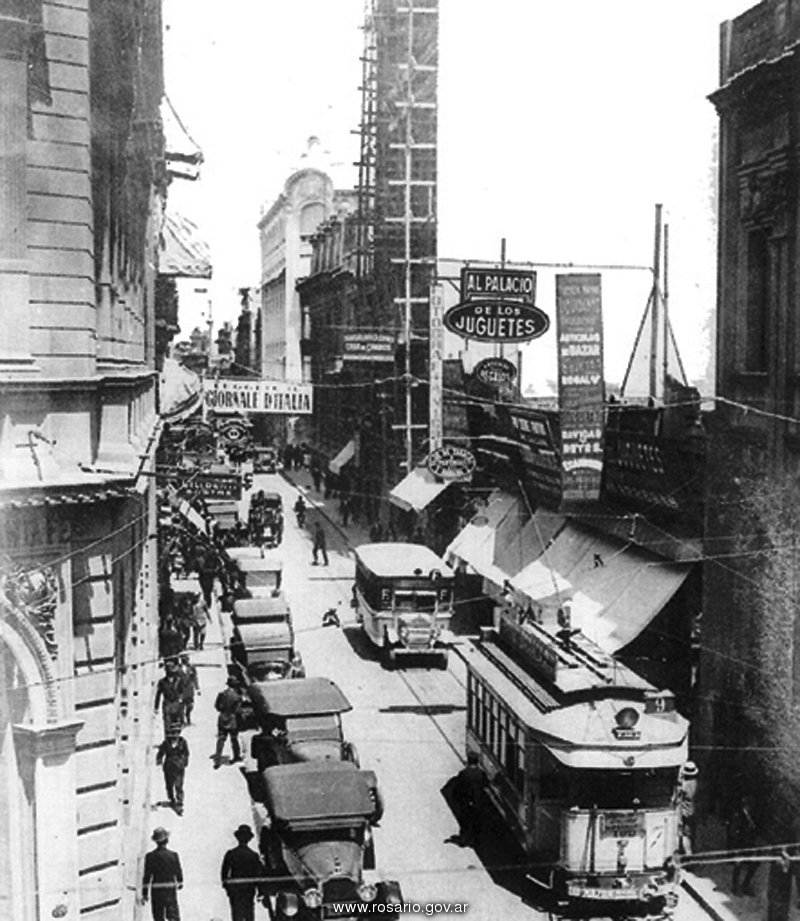
The city had a tramway network until 1963.

The Rosario public transport system includes buses, trolleybuses and taxicabs.

The Rosario trolleybus system consists of only one main trunk line. It is presently operated by a government-owned corporation, SEMTUR (Sociedad del Estado Municipal para el Transporte Urbano de Rosario, "Municipal State Society for Rosario Urban Transport"), as are some of Rosario's other urban bus lines.

Plaza Sarmiento is the hub of the city bus system, about 40 urban lines in the metropolitan area that provide service every 5 to 10 minutes.

Bus fares are pre-paid by means of either a rechargeable plastic card or a disposable paper card with a magnetic stripe which can be bought from post offices, automatic vending machines, and private businesses. For occasional use, a larger fare can be paid using a coin machine in the bus unit. The interurban lines have differential fares, and some allow payment in cash only. The municipal administration is phasing out the paper cards, in favor of the plastic ones, during the second half of 2012.

The urban bus fleet was partially renewed during the recovery of the national economy, since 2003, and consists of about 730 units. In 2005 the average age of the buses was five years and 11 months. Improvements in the economy have led to increased use of public transport and comparatively less use of bicycles. According to the Rosario Transportation Office, in 2005 there were about 11 million bus journeys per month, by 2007, usage has climbed to 420,000 people every day (12.6 million per month).

A significant number of buses run on natural gas, as it also happens in Argentina as a whole since the price of this fuel is quite low compared to the alternatives. The idea to transform all buses to this system did not prosper; most buses run on heavily subsidized diesel fuel.

In 2012 bus lanes were added to several pairs of parallel streets traversing the downtown area. Bus stops along these are spaced every three blocks instead of the usual two. For the most part, they leave room to only one additional, narrow lane on the left for cars and other vehicles. They can be used for taxis carrying passengers as well. They are exclusive for public transport during weekdays and on Saturday morning; stopping or parking on the affected streets is forbidden, as well as right turns. Their implementation attracted opposition from residents and shop owners but was well received by habitual bus users since they reduce the time needed to get out of the crowded central area by a noticeable amount.

Rosario has a medium-sized taxi fleet, with units painted black and outlined in yellow. Some belong to radio-taxi companies and can be reserved by telephone; others only in the streets. As the economy of Argentina recovers, the capacity of the taxi fleet has been strained by higher usage. In September 2005, the Deliberative Council approved the compulsory installation of radio-call systems in all taxi units, but this requirement has not been fulfilled.

Rosario is also a major hub for long-distance overland transportation from the Mariano Moreno Bus Terminal, (Terminal de Omnibus), across from the Patio de la Madera Convention and Exposition Centre complex, about 15 blocks west of Plaza San Martin. The transportation facility serves 73 bus companies in short, medium, and long-distance travel, carrying 1,100.000 passengers per month to 784 national and international destinations, which comprise most major domestic cities including Puerto Iguazú, Salta and Bariloche and international destinations such as Asunción, Paraguay, Curitiba and Rio de Janeiro, Brazil and Montevideo, Uruguay, destinations may be long but white-clad chauffeurs handle comfortable long-distance coaches with modern conveniences.

=== Railway ===
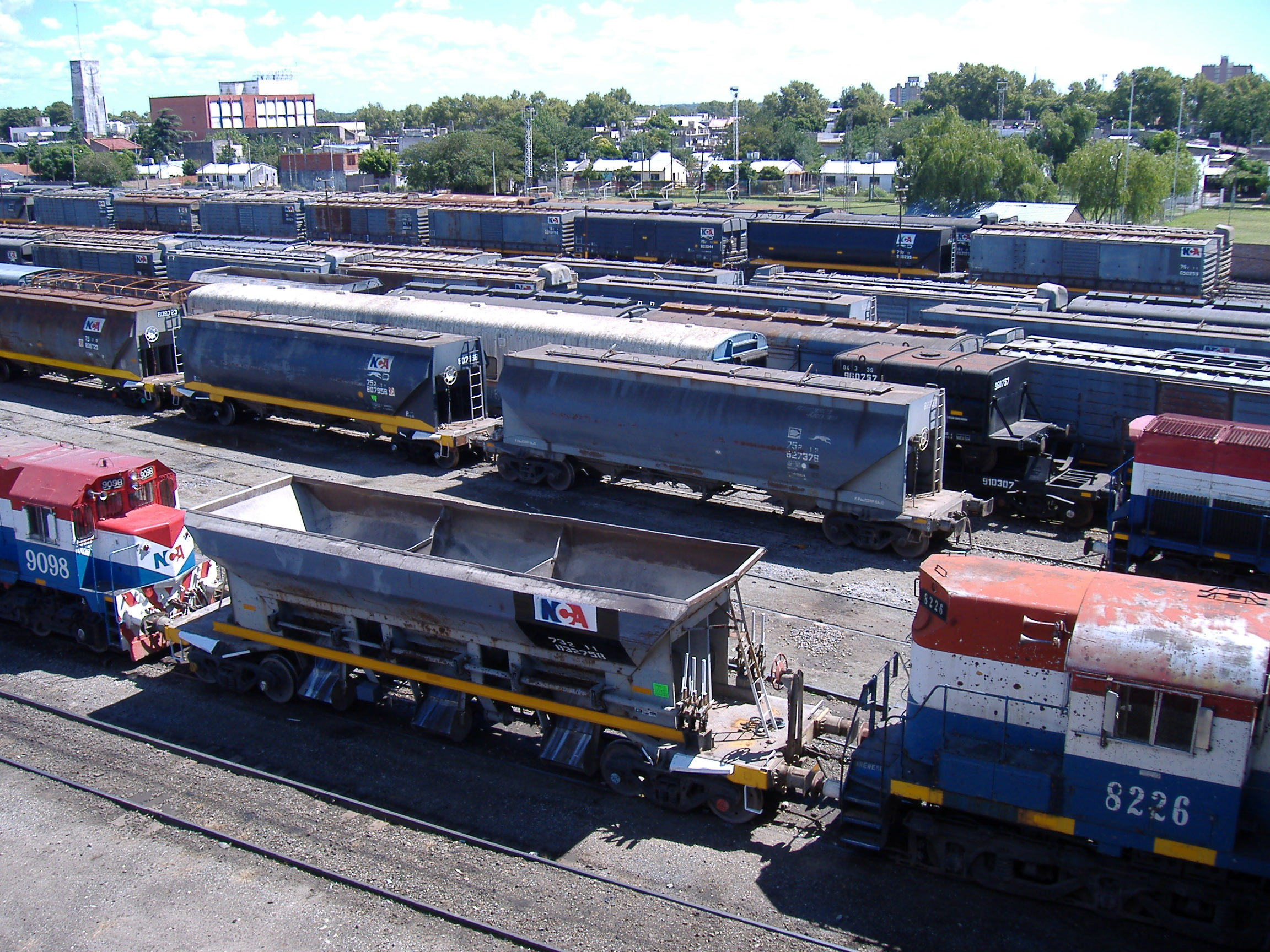
Nuevo Central Argentino (NCA) freight railway yards

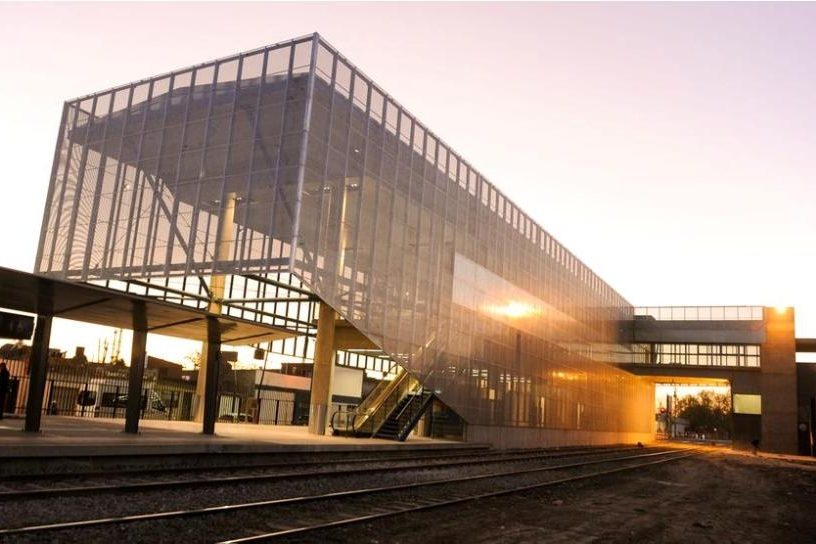
Rosario Sur Station, refurbished to run inter-city services on the General Mitre Railway

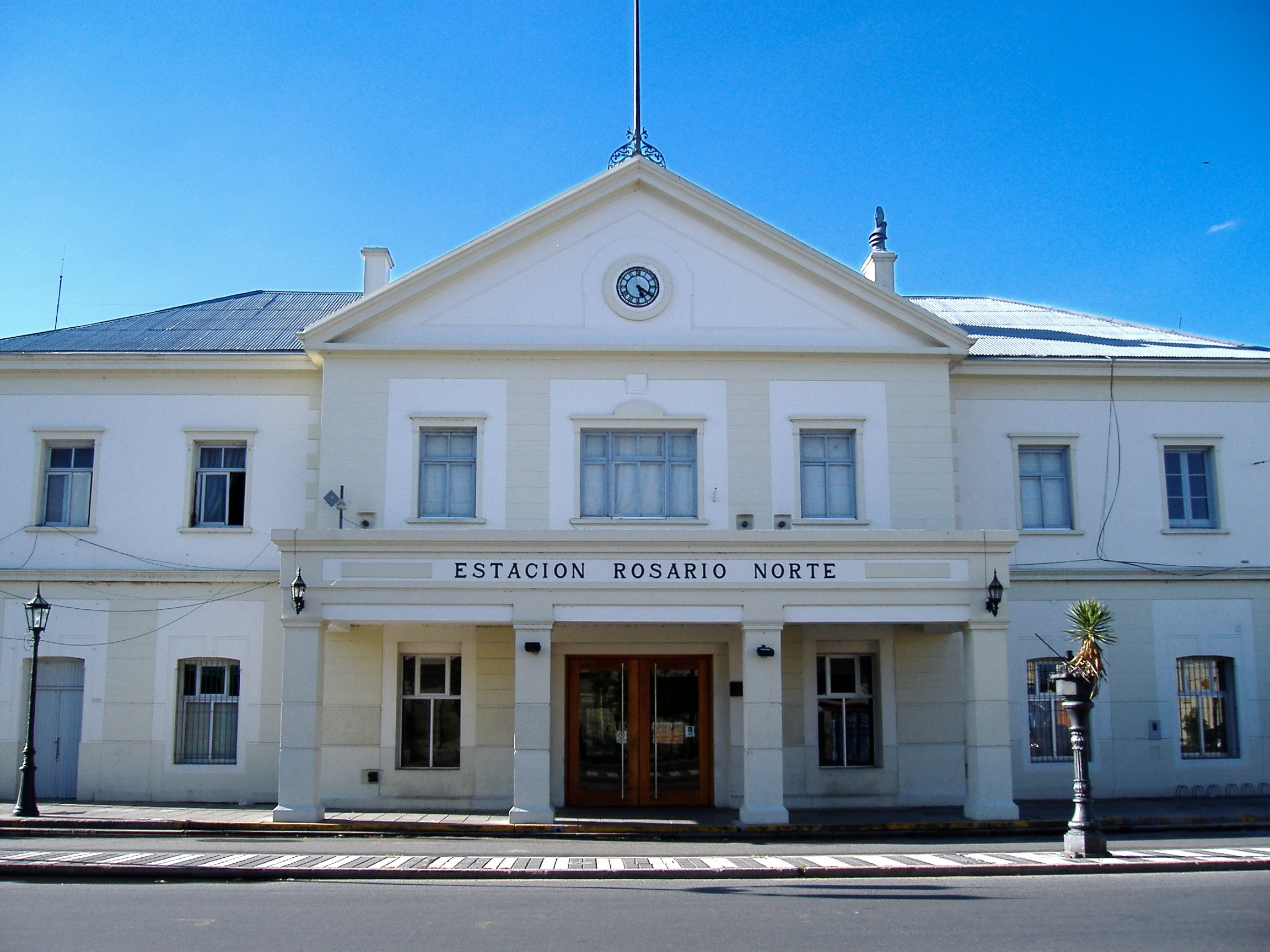
Rosario Norte

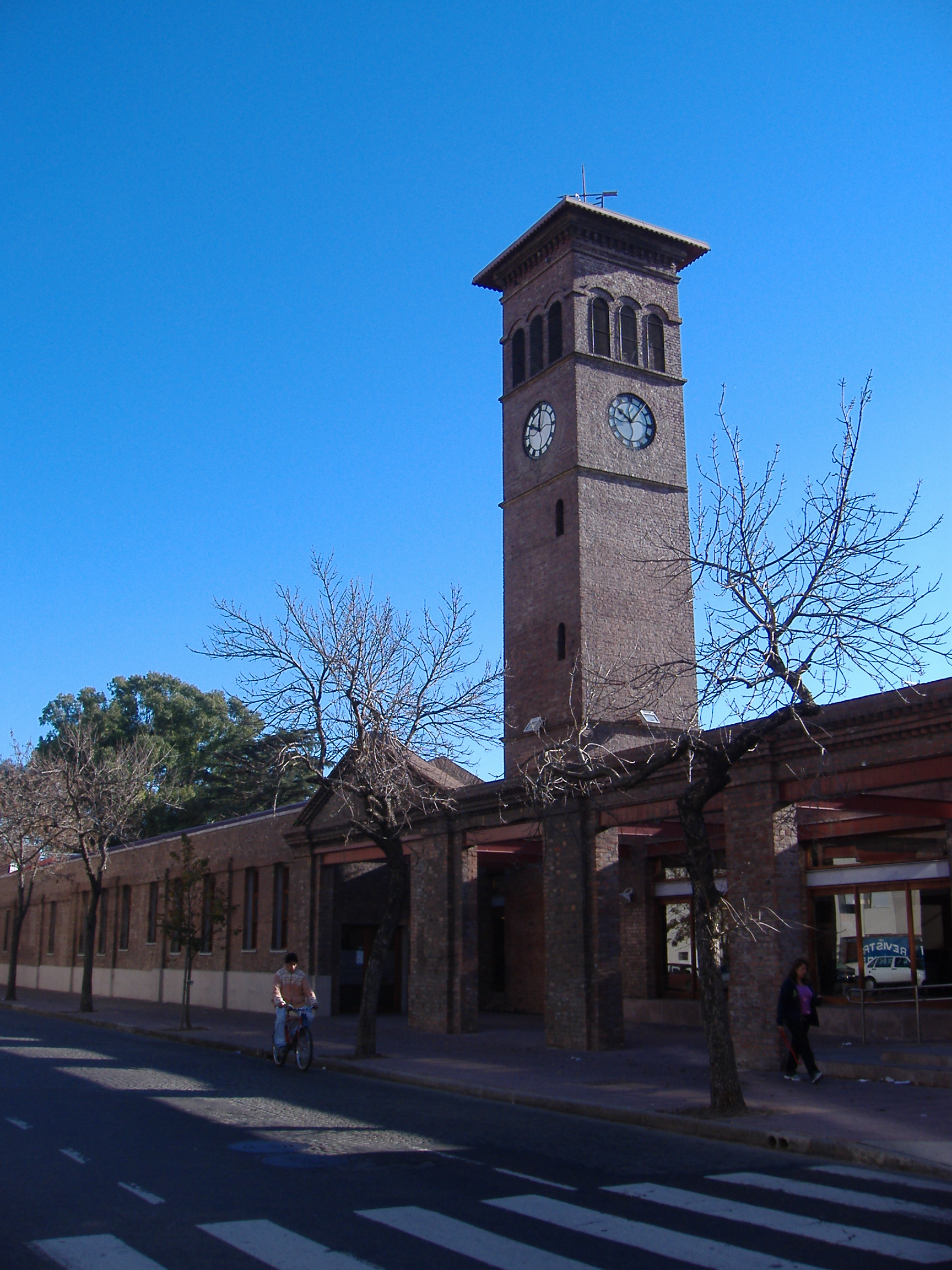
The Center Municipal District (former Rosario Central station)

Rosario was one of the main cities chosen by the British and French railway companies that built and operated some of the railways in Argentina during the 19th and early 20th centuries, with more than 15 stations operating in the city. When the entire Argentine railway network was nationalised during the presidency of Juan Perón, most of the stations (by then under the administration of State-owned company Ferrocarriles Argentinos) were closed for passenger services to reduce costs, leaving only a few active.

After the railway privatization in the early 1990s during Carlos Menem's presidency, the passenger services were considerably reduced. The lines operated by Nuevo Central Argentino (NCA) handle most of the cargo. Additionally, two private companies provided limited passenger services to several major cities. Trenes de Buenos Aires (TBA) ran weekly trains south to Retiro in Buenos Aires and north to Santa Fe. The company Ferrocentral also operated weekly trains south to Buenos Aires and northwest to Córdoba and Tucumán.

Nowadays, passenger services to Rosario are being operated by state-owned company Trenes Argentinos, running trains to Rosario Norte with stop in Rosario Sur.

The other station in the main district, Rosario Oeste, used to concentrate all the passenger services when railways were nationalised in 1948, but currently operates for freight trains only.

As of June 2021, only two stations remain active for passenger services in the city. The following chart describes the total of existing railway stations in Rosario:

Railway stations in Rosario
Station	Original company	Divis.	Status (Note: For passenger services only)	Current operator
Rosario	Central Córdoba (Note: Originally built by the Córdoba and Rosario Railway, taken over by the FCCC in 1912)	Belgrano	Closed (1949) (Note: Seat of non-profit "Asociación Rosarina Amigos del Riel")	—
Rosario Central	Central Argentine	Mitre	Closed (1977) (Note: Seat of the Center Municipal District.)	—
Rosario Norte (Note: Terminus of Buenos Aires and Rosario Railway)	BA & Rosario	Mitre	Active	Trenes Argentinos
Rosario Oeste	Central Córdoba	Belgrano	Closed (1993)	—
Rosario	Santa Fe Western	Mitre	Closed (1900) (Note: Seat of Rosario Audiovisual Center.)	—
Rosario	Prov. Santa Fe	Belgrano	Closed (1949) (Note: Refurbished and opened as a bus station in 1950.)	—
Rosario Sur (Note: Built by defunct state-owned Ferrocarriles Argentinos in the same line of former BA&RR, as a south-side stop.)	Ferrocarriles Argentinos	Mitre	Active	Trenes Argentinos
Rosario	Rosario & Pto. Belgrano	Mitre	Closed (1949) (Note: Campus of the National University of Rosario)	—
Antártida Argentina	Central Argentine	Mitre	Closed (1977) (Note: Seat of the Cultural Center of Fisherton, lent by NCA to the Municipality of Rosario.)	—
Barrio Vila	Central Argentine	Mitre	Closed (1977) (Note: Closed for passenger services in 1977, part of the line granted to NCA with no operations on those stations)	—
Cruce Alberdi	Central Argentine	Mitre	Closed (1977)	Trenes Argentinos (Note: Intermediate station in the long distance passenger services Retiro–Tucumán)
El Gaucho	Central Córdoba	Belgrano	Closed (1985)	—
Empalme Graneros	Central Córdoba	Belgrano	Closed (1969) (Note: Closed after being burned during a protest movement (mostly known as "Rosariazo") against the military dictatorial government, in 1969.)	—
Ludueña	Central Argentine	Mitre	Closed (1977)	Trenes Argentinos
Nuevo Alberdi	Central Córdoba	Belgrano	Closed (?)	—
Sarratea	BA & Rosario	Mitre	Closed (1977)	—
Sorrento	Central Córdoba	Belgrano	Closed (1930) (Note: Served as freight station until 1930. After a long time of abandonment and deterioration, it was demolished in 2022.)	—

==== Projects ====
There was a project to build a high-speed train between Buenos Aires-Rosario-Córdoba, scheduled to be started in 2008, with an inauguration in 2012, that would join Rosario and Buenos Aires in 85 minutes, and would reach Córdoba in another 90 minutes at speeds of up to 320 km/h (199 mph). However it never was constructed and the project was finally suspended after the controversy it generated among the citizens and the media critics because of the high costs it implicated.

==== Trams ====
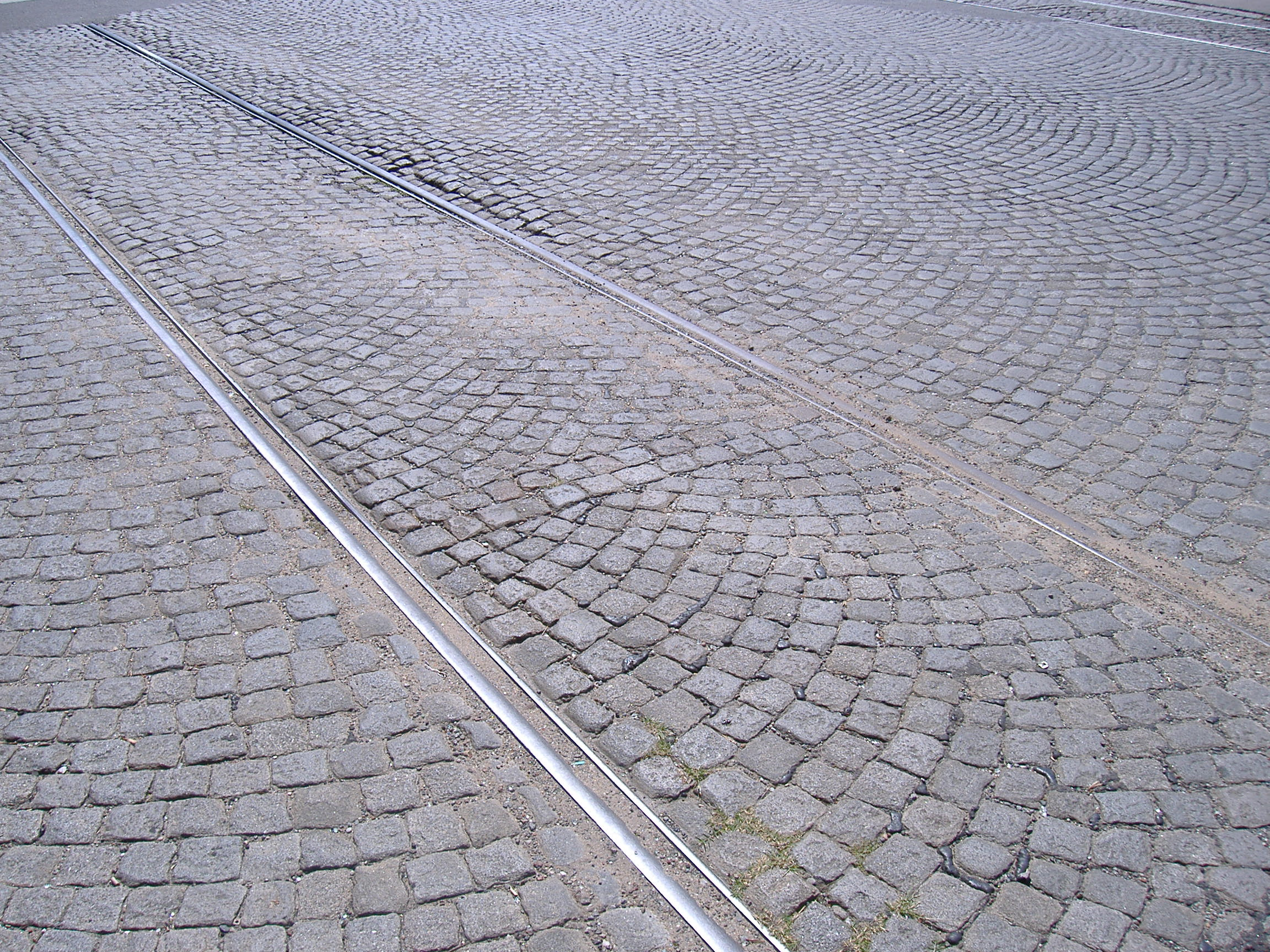
Tram tracks are still visible in parts of the city.

The city once had a large tramway network with 192 km of track in the centre of the city, however this was abandoned in 1963 after fierce competition from bus transport in the city. The city now has two heritage tramways, one of which uses vintage trams converted to run on rubber tyres, while the other uses the original trams from the city refurbished to run on rails.

More recently, a metro system was proposed for the city, though this was shelved in favour of a new urban tramway network. The network is currently in the bidding process, with large firms like Siemens and Industrial and Commercial Bank of China bidding for its construction. It is expected to begin at the recently inaugurated Rosario Sur Station and run northwards through the city.

=== Roadways ===
Rosario is linked to the rest of the country by a number of roads: the Aramburu Highway (southeast, to Buenos Aires), National Route 9 (from Buenos Aires to Rosario and then north and west up to Jujuy and Bolivia), the Brigadier Estanislao López Highway (north, to Santa Fe City), National Route 11 (to the north of Santa Fe, Formosa and Paraguay), National Route 33 (to the southwest of Santa Fe and the province of Buenos Aires, and then through National Route 7 to San Luis, Mendoza and Chile), National Route 34 (north to Santiago del Estero, Tucumán and Bolivia), and National Route 174 (east, to Entre Ríos, over the Rosario-Victoria Bridge).

It is surrounded with an extensive system of two belt-highways called Circunvalación Motorway and A012 which in turn set the limits of the city.

The beltway is 30 km (19 mi) and was built for traffic to avoid the congested city centre, allowing drivers to bypass the city going around it in a much shorter time. In its 30-kilometre (19 mi) length, it intersects with National Route 9, National Route 3, National Route 34, National Route 11 and National Route 174.

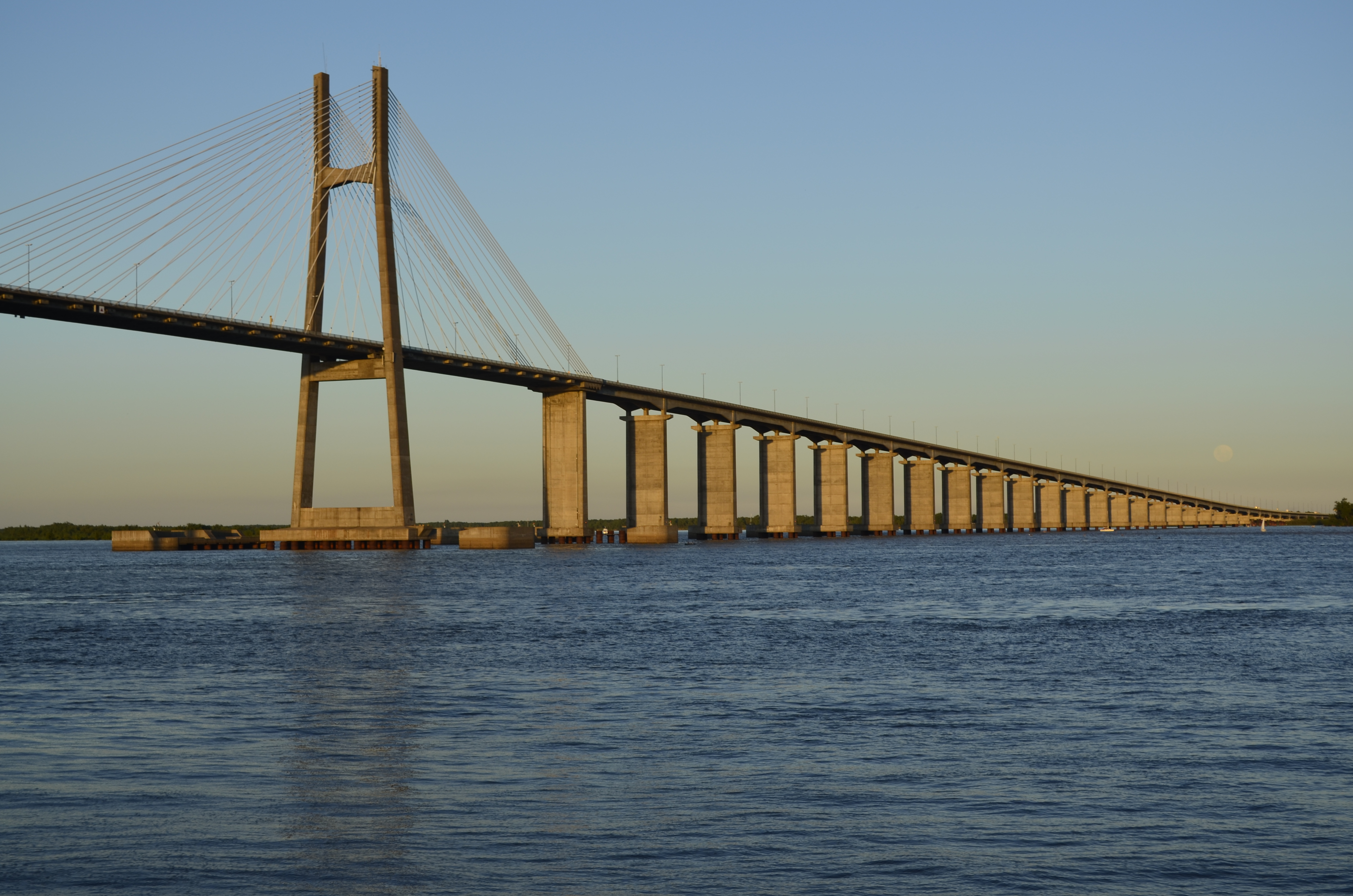
The Rosario-Victoria Bridge

The official numbering system denotes this road as "A008" but this denomination is mostly unknown by the locals as it is still called "Avenida de Circunvalación 25 de Mayo" ("25 of May Beltway Avenue") commemorating the May Revolution of 1810. Some sections are named after different personalities by local decree. For example:

- The section from the east end on 27 Boulevard to the crossing of Ayacucho Street (old exit to the Rosario-Buenos Aires Highway, now access to Provincial Route 21), is called "National Route A008 Tte. General Juan Carlos Sánchez" by decree #232 of 14 May 1981.
- The section between National Route 9 and the exit to Santa Fe (the state capital) National Route 11 on the intersection with Rondeau Boulevard is called "National Route A008 Dr. Constantino Razzetti" by law #25769 of 1 September 2003.

The A012 is the second beltway at the southeast of the city. It has a semi-circular length centered around the city, running as a long-length beltway. From the National Route 9 junction on km marker 278, in the town of Esther, to the junction with National Route 11 on km marker 326 in the city of San Lorenzo it runs for 67 km (41.6 mi).

This road is popularly known as the Second Rosario Beltway, as it borders the metropolitan area of greater Rosario. Through National Decree 1595 of 1979 this road switched to federal control. Beforehand this road was called Provincial Route 16.

=== Airports ===
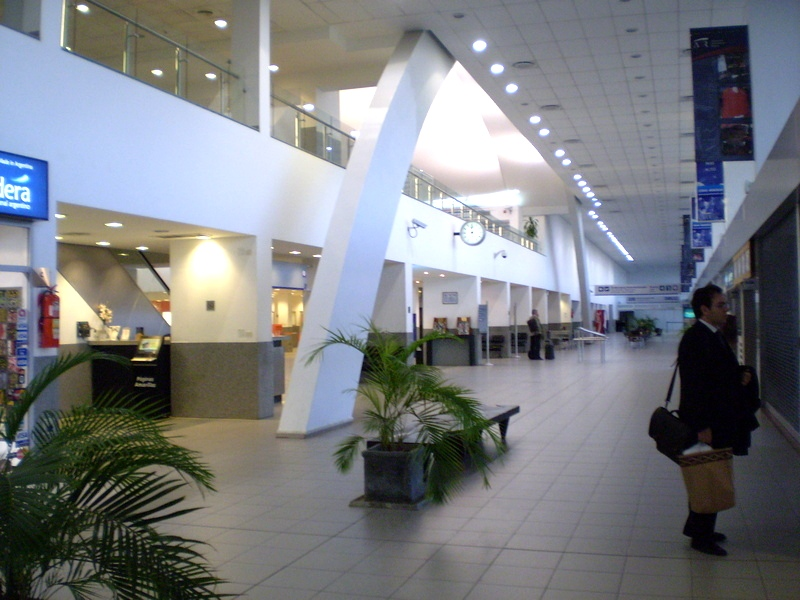
Rosario International Airport

The Rosario – Islas Malvinas International Airport is located 13 km (8 mi) west-northwest from the center of Rosario, a city in the Santa Fe Province of Argentina. The city of Funes lies directly to the west of the airport, and part of the city limit shares a border with the property of the airport grounds. The airport covers an area of 550 hectares (1,400 acres) and is operated by the Province of Santa Fe.

The airport serves the Greater Rosario area and is the main hub for Sol Líneas Aéreas and is also served by Aerolíneas Argentinas, Copa and Gol Transportes Aéreos. There are domestic flights within Argentina from Rosario to Buenos Aires, Córdoba, Mar del Plata (via Buenos Aires), Mendoza (vía Córdoba), Santa Fe and Villa Gesell (via Buenos Aires) cities as well as international services to, Porto Alegre, Brazil, and Punta del Este, Uruguay (direct flight in summer and via Buenos Aires in fall, winter and spring). The airport is at an altitude of 25 metres (82 ft). Its longest runway measures 3,000 metres (9,843 ft).

=== Port ===
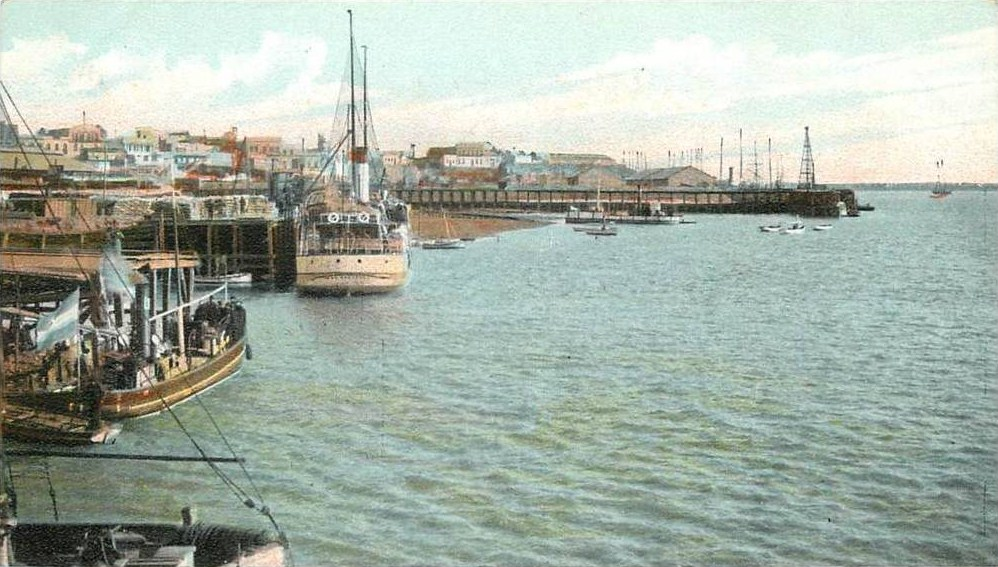
The Port of Rosario, c. 1910

The Port of Rosario is an inland port and a major goods-shipping centre of Argentina, located in the city of Rosario, province of Santa Fe, on the left-hand (western) shore of the Paraná River, about 550 km (340 mi) upstream from the Atlantic Ocean.

At this point of the course of the Paraná River (Kilometer 420, Mile 260), there is the depth transition between overseas and river navigation. The main channel of the river directly in front of the port has an advantageous configuration that allows preservation of a depth of 10 metres (34 ft) with minor periodic dredging. This allows for downstream navigation of vessels up to Panamax standards. The Paraná is about 600 metres (1,970 ft) wide at Kilometer 418. It becomes 2,000 m (1.2 mi) wide downstream.

The port is the largest of a series located in the several cities of the Greater Rosario that lie on the Paraná; the last (northernmost) able of overseas traffic being Puerto General San Martín (23 km (14 mi)). It is part of the Bi-Oceanic Corridor, which joins the Atlantic with the Pacific Ocean via Buenos Aires, Rosario, Córdoba, and the Cuyo region; going north–south it forms the axis of the Paraguay-Paraná waterway. It directly services the area of Santa Fe that produces a large portion of Argentine exports, and indirectly the whole Mercosur trade bloc. In 2003 the traffic in the port amounted to 2.9 million tonnes (3,200,000 short tons).

Cargo from other parts of Argentina is brought into the port by the railway lines of the Nuevo Central Argentino, communicating with Córdoba (west) and Zárate, Buenos Aires (south), as well as the multiple national and provincial roads and highways that converge in Rosario. Communication with the north-eastern part of the country was enhanced by the 2003 opening of the Rosario-Victoria Bridge, that joins the city with the province of Entre Ríos. The Rosario International Airport (located 15 km (9 mi) west) has also been refurbished to work with cargo traffic.

== Education ==
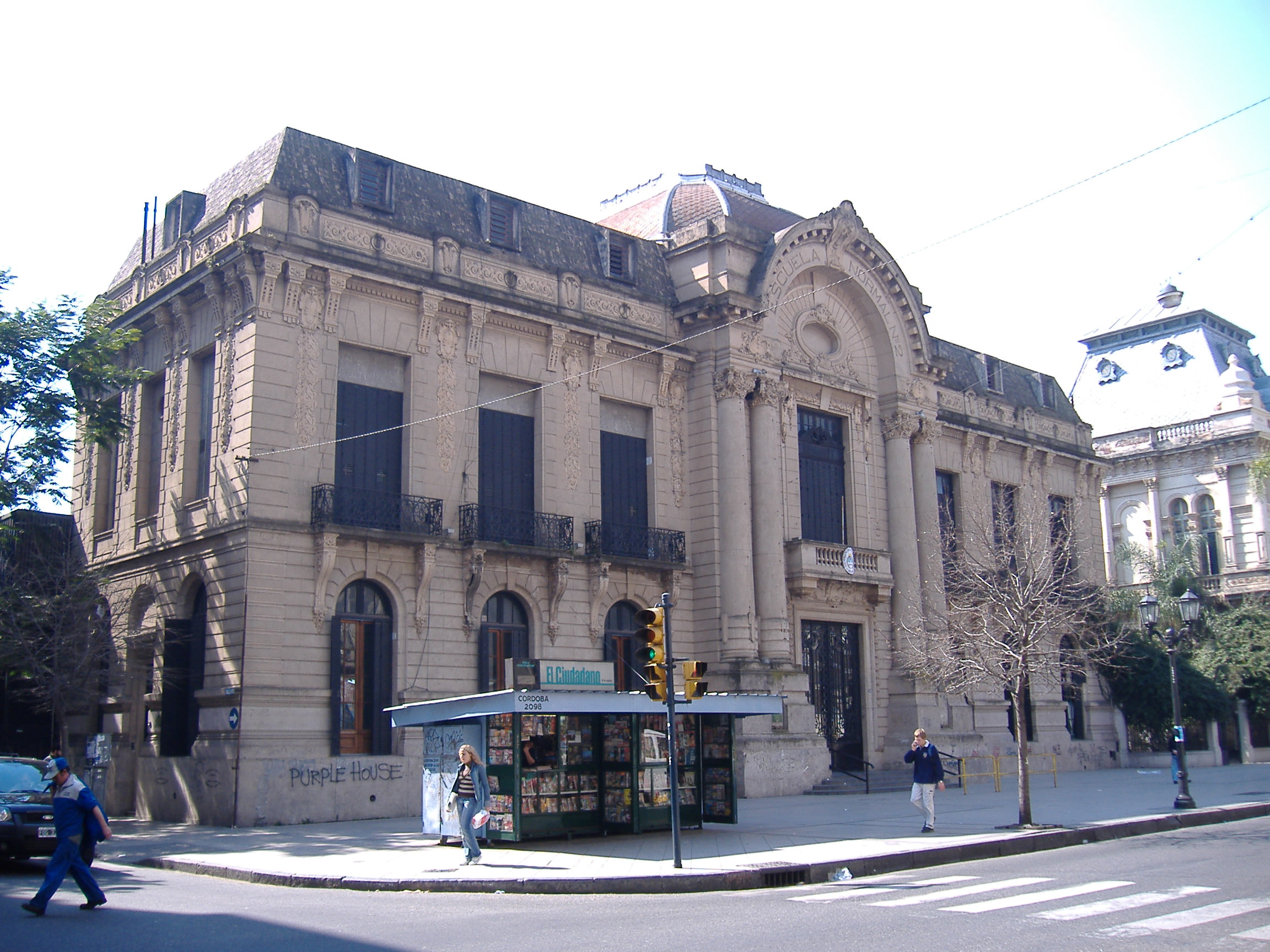
Teachers' School, on Córdoba Avenue

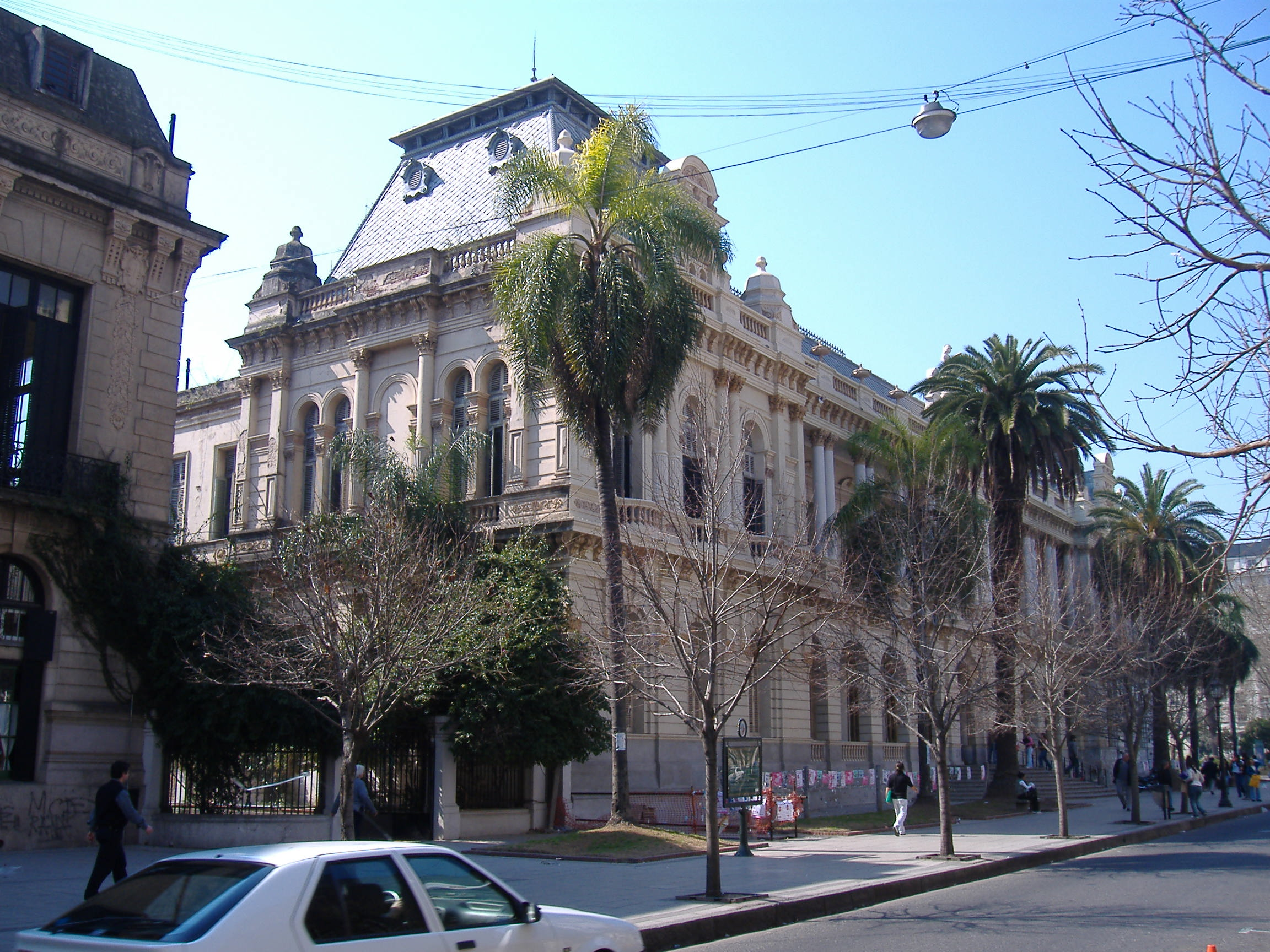
National University of Rosario Law School

Rosario is an important educational centre at a national and international level. It is the home of the National University of Rosario (UNR) since 1968, which includes the Law Faculty, the Medicine Faculty, the Humanities Faculty and an advanced study centre called Ciudad Universitaria de Rosario (university city of Rosario) that is home to more than 10 colleges, among them the Faculty of Psychology, the Faculty of Political Sciences, and the Faculty of Architecture. It is also home of the Rosario Regional Faculty, a branch of the National Technological University (UTN). All of these national colleges are free.

In the city there are approximately 624 establishments destined for elementary levels and secondary education, the Technical Institute, which depends directly on the UNR. With a solid tradition as for university education, it is head of several academic institutions, and is public, and free access.

Currently, there are some 80,000 university students at various institutions around the city, representing approximately 8.5% of the total population. This rate is one of the highest in Argentina. In Rosario, nearly 15% of the population benefits from higher education degrees, or have undergone at least some university studies.

Rosario has private colleges, as the Pontifical Catholic University of Argentina (UCA), the Austral University, the University of the Latin American Educational Center (UCEL), the Interamerican Open University (UAI), the Italian University of Rosario (IUNIR), the San Martin University and the University of Concepcion del Uruguay which are private institutions.

== Language ==
Rosario is the third largest urban center where Rioplatense Spanish is spoken, after Buenos Aires and Montevideo. The local language evidences the typical linguistic features that characterize this dialect, notably the voseo (use of vos instead of tú as pronoun for the second person singular) and the sheísmo (form of yeísmo where ll- and y- are pronounced as a voiceless [ʃ]). Although the español rosarino does not differ substantially from the other variants of the same dialect, it presents particularities easily noticeable by those who live in the other main populated areas of the region.

One of the most notable characteristics of the language of Rosario's area of influence is the process of aspiration and disappearance of the -s. When the -s is in implosive position, end of syllable or word followed by consonant, its sound becomes a soft and voiceless aspiration [h] (the word obispo is pronounced o̞ˈβihpo̞). In the popular and vulgar language, the final -s, -r, or -d are sometimes suppressed, although this phenomenon is commonly associated to sociocultural groups of lower formal education.

Just as in Buenos Aires, the voseo is pronominal and verbal. The pronoun tú and its associated verbal forms are non-existent (which is not the case in the Montevideo variant) The tendency to add a final -s to the verbal forms of the second person plural (vos fuistes, vos vinistes), which is rather common in Buenos Aires, is very unusual among Rosario natives.

Even though the lexicon of Rosario and Buenos Aires is effectively identical, there are numerous terms and idioms that Rosario shares with the rest of the country (even areas where a different dialect prevails) but not with the capital, as well as other words and expressions that are unique to the rosarino speech, both formal and informal.

The Rosarigasino is a type of Jerigonza (game of words) that originated in the city and was rather common in the informal speech during the 20th century. Although it has fallen into disuse, it has become a language of cult among certain local groups.

== Sports ==
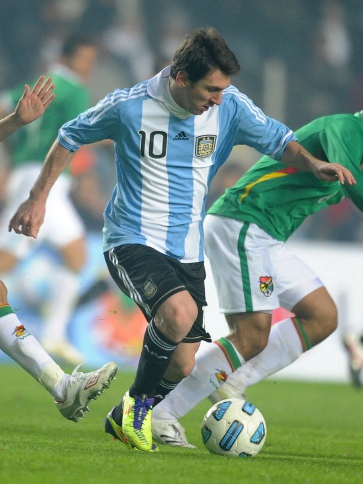
Lionel Messi, born in Rosario in 1987

Rosario is the home of the football clubs Rosario Central (founded 1889) and Newell's Old Boys (founded 1903). Both play in Primera División Argentina. Central has won six National championships (in 1971, 1973, 1980, 1987, 2023 and in 2025), six National cups (1913, 1915, two cups in 1916, 1920 and 2018), and one international title: the Conmebol Cup (in 1995, precursor of the current Copa Sudamericana). Newell's has 6 National championships (in 1974, 1988, 1991, 1992, 2004 and in 2013) and 3 National cups (in 1911, 1921 and in 1949). Rosario's other football clubs are Club Atlético Central Córdoba, currently playing in Primera C, Club Atlético Tiro Federal Argentino in Torneo Argentino A and Argentino de Rosario in Primera D.

It is also the hometown of Argentine internationals Lionel Messi, Ángel Di María, Maximiliano Rodríguez, César Delgado, Ezequiel Lavezzi, Mauro Icardi, Giovani Lo Celso, Leandro Fernández, Ezequiel Garay, Luciana Aymar, Juan Imhoff, Ángel Correa, Nicolás Vergallo and Leonardo Senatore.

The city received international attention as the host of the II South American Games in 1982, as one of the host cities of the 1978 FIFA World Cup, the 1982 FIVB Volleyball Men's World Championship, the 1993 FIVB Volleyball Men's U21 World Championship, the 2001 FIFA World Youth Championship and the 1990 Basketball World Cup. Rosario also bid for the 2019 Pan American Games but the Argentine Olympic Committee (COA) voted to support La Punta instead.

Rosario is the second choice site for Argentine rugby tests, after Buenos Aires. Famous rugby clubs from the city include Club Atlético del Rosario – one of the four UAR founding clubs – and also Jockey Club de Rosario and Duendes Rugby Club, both former winners of the Nacional de Clubes title. The city hosted the 2010 IRB Junior World Championship.

The 2010 Women's Hockey World Cup, 2004 and 2012 Champions Trophy and the 2014–15 Women's FIH Hockey World League Final were played there.

In 2014 the city hosted the Inline speed skating World Championship at Parque de la Independencia and in 2015 it hosted the men's, women's and juniors' FIRS Inline Hockey World Championships at Club Atlético Provincial's indoor arena.

Rosario hosted the 2017 World Archery Youth Championships, the 2018 FIBA Under-17 Basketball World Cup, and the 2019 South American Beach Games, 2022 South American Youth Games 2026 South American Games. The city will host the 2029 Junior Pan American Games.

=== Motorsports ===
The city was the starting point for the 2014 Dakar Rally, as well as the finishing point in 2016. It also hosted the 2015 World RX of Argentina.

== Events ==
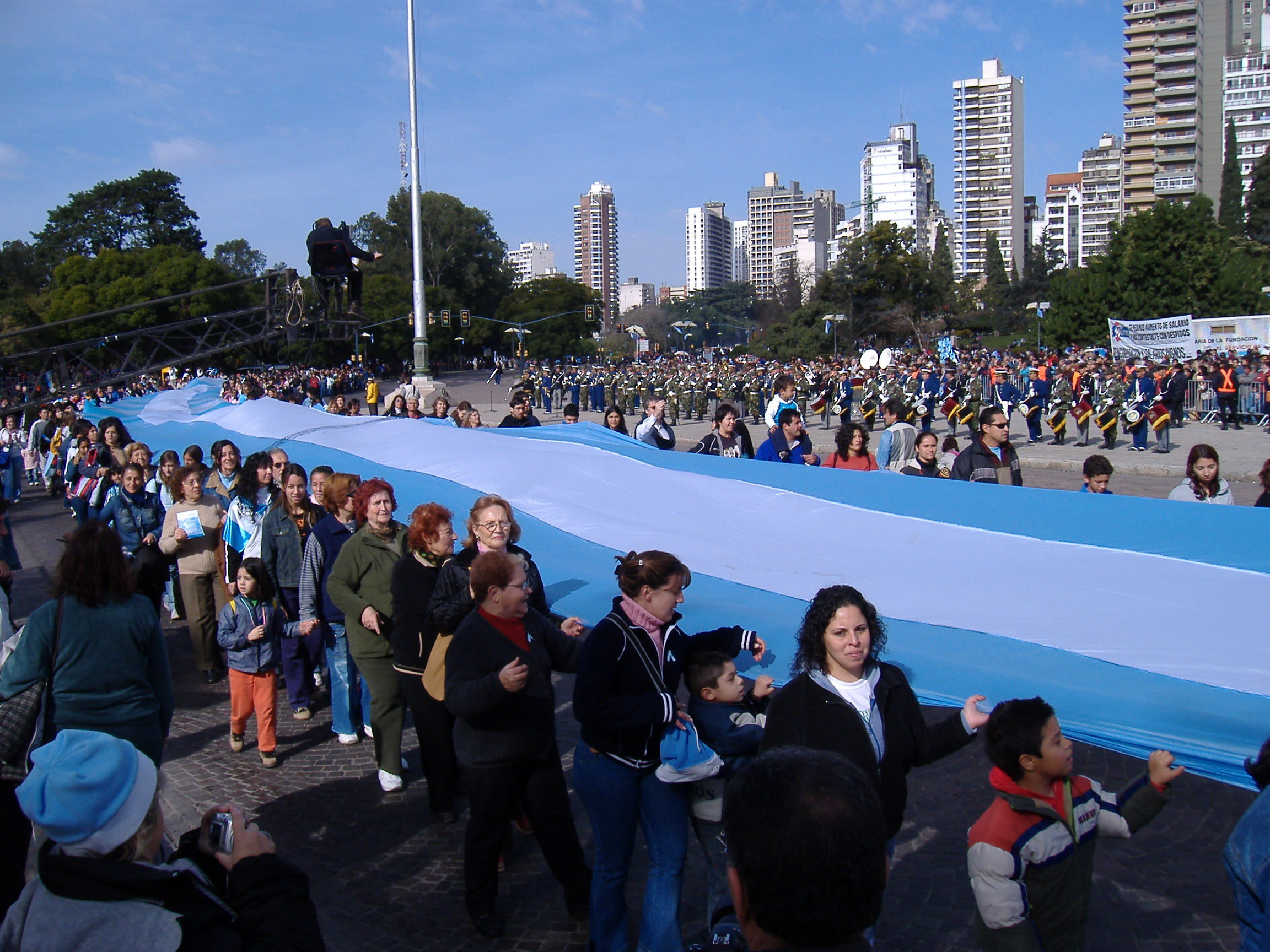
Participants carry the national colors on Flag Day (June 20).

- Festival Latinoamericano de Video Rosario (Rosario Latin American Video Festival). Annual event (September), starting in 1994.
- Encuentro Internacional de Escultura en Madera-Piedra-Hierro de Rosario (International Meeting of Wood-Stone-Iron Sculpture in Rosario). Annual event (September/October), since 1993.
- Encuentro y Fiesta Nacional de Colectividades (Communities Meeting and National Celebration). Annual event, starting in 1985, showcasing music, song, dance, cuisine and customs of foreign communities in Argentina, in the ample room provided by the Parque Nacional a la Bandera (National Flag Park). Usually held in November; in 2004 it was postponed to the beginning of December in order to avoid overlap with the Third International Congress of the Spanish Language.
- Festival Internacional de Poesía de Rosario (International Poetry Festival). Annual event since 1993 (November).
- Festival Iberoamericano de Cine de Rosario (Ibero-American Film Festival). Annual event since 2003 (November).
- Leyendas ("Legends"). A cartoon, role-playing and science fiction convention. Annually since 1999, usually in autumn (April/May), sometimes in spring (November).

== Geography ==
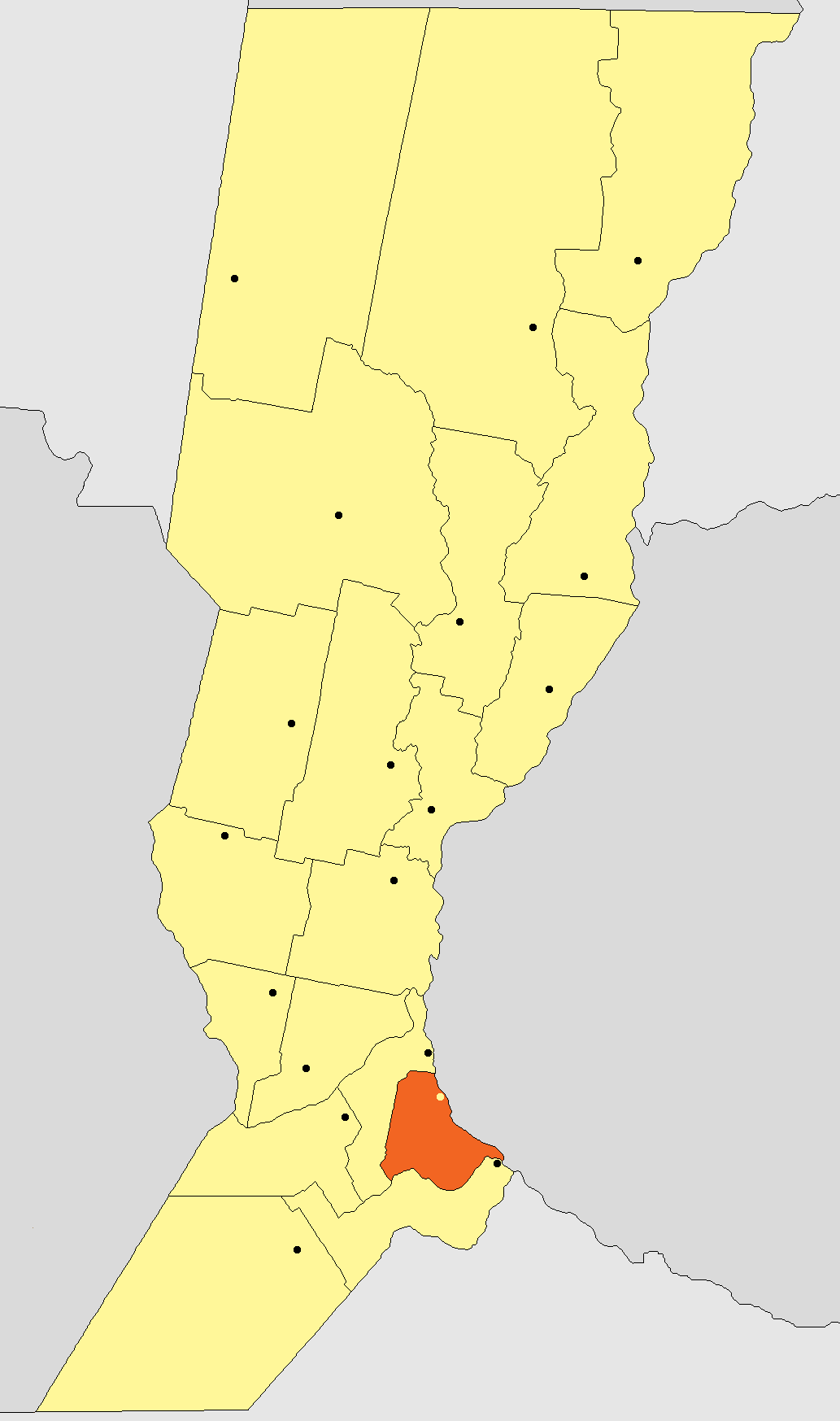
Rosario metropolitan area in the Province of Santa Fe

The city of Rosario measures 178.69 km^{2} (69.0 sq mi), not all of them are fully urbanized. Its extreme points are:

- Latitude: parallels 32°52′18″ and 33°02′22″ South.
- Longitude: meridians 60°36′44″ and 60°47′46″ West.

The geographical center is approximately at 32°57′2″S 60°42′15″W

The city is located on a smoothly undulated plain typical of the Pampas, between 22.5 and 24.6 metres above mean sea level; the original settlement rests on the ravine on the right-hand shore of the Paraná, opposite a group of islands of the Paraná Delta which are partly in the jurisdiction of the province of Entre Ríos. The nearest city across the river's flood plain (60 km) is Victoria, Entre Ríos, linked to Rosario by the Rosario-Victoria Bridge.

Rosario lies on the ravine of the right-hand shore of the Paraná, about 24 metres (79 ft) above mean sea level, in a place with a natural slope to the low shore. The point of origin of the city is Plaza 25 de Mayo ("May 25 Square"), now surrounded by the municipality (Palacio de los Leones), the Basilica Cathedral of Our Lady of the Rosary, the Central Post Office, the Decorative Art Museum and a building called La Bola de Nieve ("The Snowball"). Between the Cathedral and the municipal building is Pasaje Juramento ("Oath Passage"), leading to the Flag Memorial. The streets mostly follow a regular checkerboard pattern.

=== Climate ===
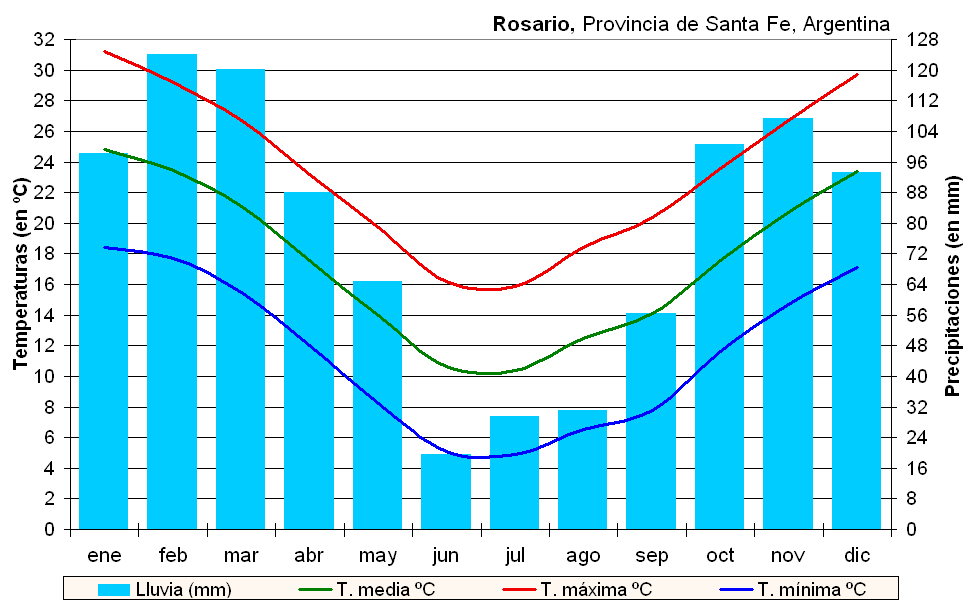
Climate chart

The Rosario area has a Pampean, humid subtropical climate (Köppen climate classification: Cfa/Cwa), and is well known for its changeable weather conditions. The city has average temperatures of 23.7 °C (74.7 °F) maximum and 11.8 °C (53.2 °F) minimum. The annual rainfall is 1,038 mm (40.9 in).

Rosario is usually warmer than other mainland Argentine capital cities in the winter. The lowest average in winter is 4.4 °C (40 °F). This is due in part to the city's flat topography, its situation on the Paraná River bank, and the presence of high density of urbanization. Those conditions have created a microclimate known as urban heat island that often means that the city is significantly warmer than its surrounding rural areas.

The temperature difference usually is greater at night than during the day, greater in winter than in summer and most apparent when winds are light. However snowfalls are extremely rare: the most recent occurrence of sleet in the CBD was on 9 July 2007. During the spring Rosario commonly enjoys extended periods of warm weather and clear skies. Rosario has average day-night temperatures of 23–10 °C (73–50 °F). The city experiences hot and humid summer days, with maximum temperatures above 35 °C (95 °F), when northerly winds blow humid air from Brazil. The record high temperature is 40.5 °C (104.9 °F) on January 9, 2006, while the record low is −8.4 °C (17 °F) on July 15, 2020.

Climate data for Rosario (Islas Malvinas Airport), elevation: 25 m, 1991–2020 normals, extremes 1875–present
Month	Jan	Feb	Mar	Apr	May	Jun	Jul	Aug	Sep	Oct	Nov	Dec	Year
Record high °C (°F)	40.6 (105.1)	39.3 (102.7)	37.0 (98.6)	34.3 (93.7)	32.9 (91.2)	29.6 (85.3)	31.6 (88.9)	36.1 (97.0)	37.3 (99.1)	38.0 (100.4)	39.5 (103.1)	40.7 (105.3)	40.7 (105.3)
Mean daily maximum °C (°F)	30.9 (87.6)	29.4 (84.9)	27.7 (81.9)	23.9 (75.0)	20.1 (68.2)	17.0 (62.6)	16.5 (61.7)	19.2 (66.6)	21.5 (70.7)	24.3 (75.7)	27.5 (81.5)	29.8 (85.6)	24.0 (75.2)
Daily mean °C (°F)	24.8 (76.6)	23.4 (74.1)	21.5 (70.7)	17.7 (63.9)	14.2 (57.6)	11.0 (51.8)	10.1 (50.2)	12.3 (54.1)	15.0 (59.0)	18.2 (64.8)	21.3 (70.3)	23.6 (74.5)	17.8 (64.0)
Mean daily minimum °C (°F)	18.7 (65.7)	17.7 (63.9)	16.0 (60.8)	12.4 (54.3)	9.4 (48.9)	6.2 (43.2)	4.9 (40.8)	6.3 (43.3)	8.7 (47.7)	12.3 (54.1)	15.0 (59.0)	17.3 (63.1)	12.1 (53.8)
Record low °C (°F)	7.0 (44.6)	5.0 (41.0)	1.2 (34.2)	−0.9 (30.4)	−6.1 (21.0)	−8.1 (17.4)	−8.4 (16.9)	−7.8 (18.0)	−4.8 (23.4)	−1.2 (29.8)	1.8 (35.2)	5.1 (41.2)	−8.4 (16.9)
Average precipitation mm (inches)	120.7 (4.75)	127.4 (5.02)	138.4 (5.45)	119.9 (4.72)	57.7 (2.27)	28.3 (1.11)	23.0 (0.91)	35.3 (1.39)	48.0 (1.89)	118.7 (4.67)	108.2 (4.26)	127.9 (5.04)	1,053.5 (41.48)
Average precipitation days (≥ 0.1 mm)	7.3	7.7	7.4	8.5	5.3	4.5	4.2	3.6	5.3	8.9	8.2	9.0	79.8
Average relative humidity (%)	67.8	72.8	75.4	78.1	81.0	80.9	77.9	72.6	68.5	69.3	65.6	65.5	73.0
Mean monthly sunshine hours	297.6	240.1	235.6	183.0	173.6	147.0	173.6	195.3	195.0	223.2	267.0	288.3	2,619.3
Mean daily sunshine hours	9.6	8.5	7.6	6.1	5.6	4.9	5.6	6.3	6.5	7.2	8.9	9.3	7.2
Percentage possible sunshine	73	71	64	64	58	50	52	59	56	58	65	65	61
Source 1: Servicio Meteorológico Nacional
Source 2: Meteo Climat (record highs and lows), Oficina de Riesgo Agropecuario (March/April/October/November/December record highs, and July/September/October/December record low), UNLP (percent sun 1971–1980)

== Broadcasting and communications ==
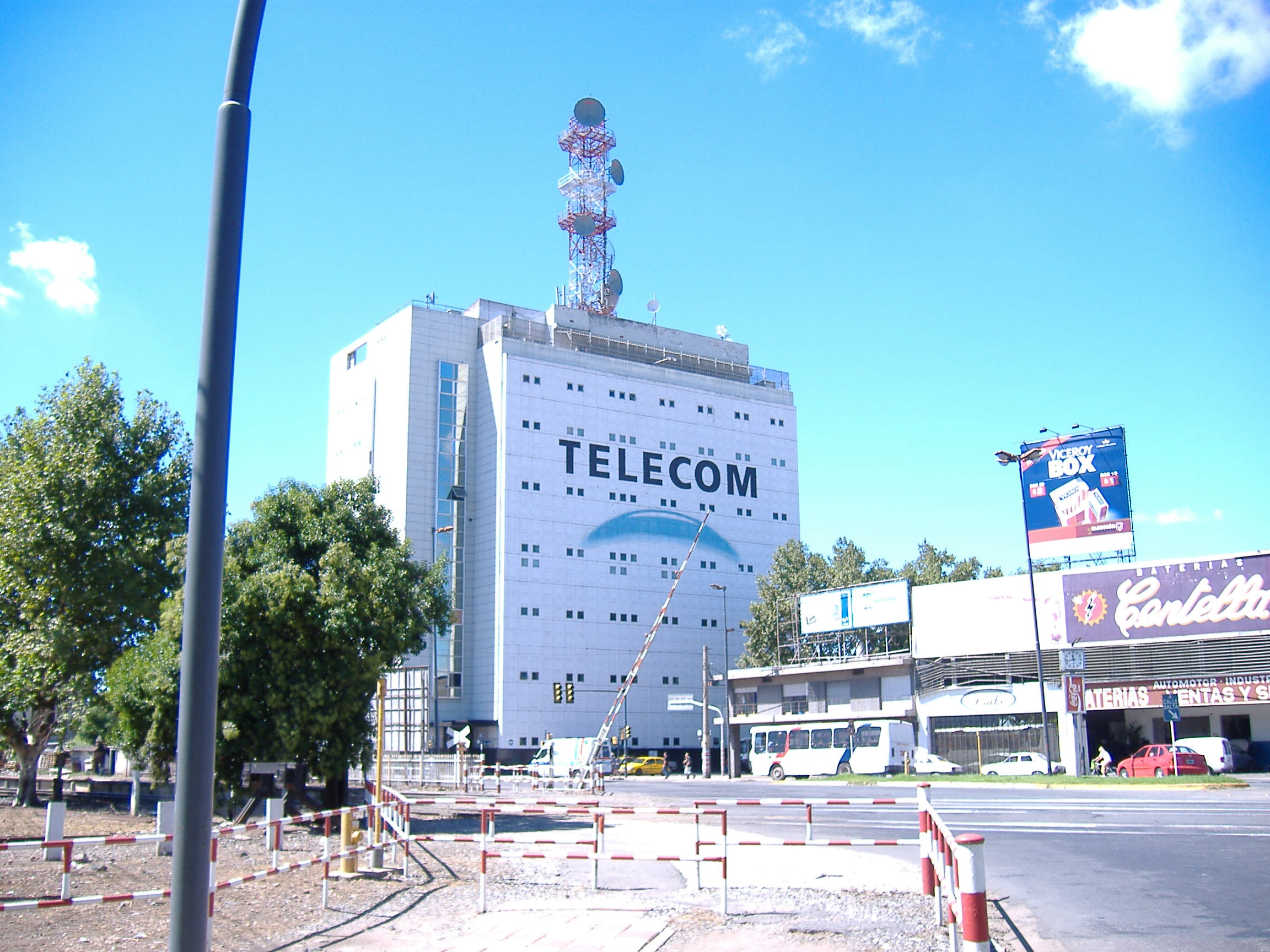
Rosario offices of Telecom Argentina

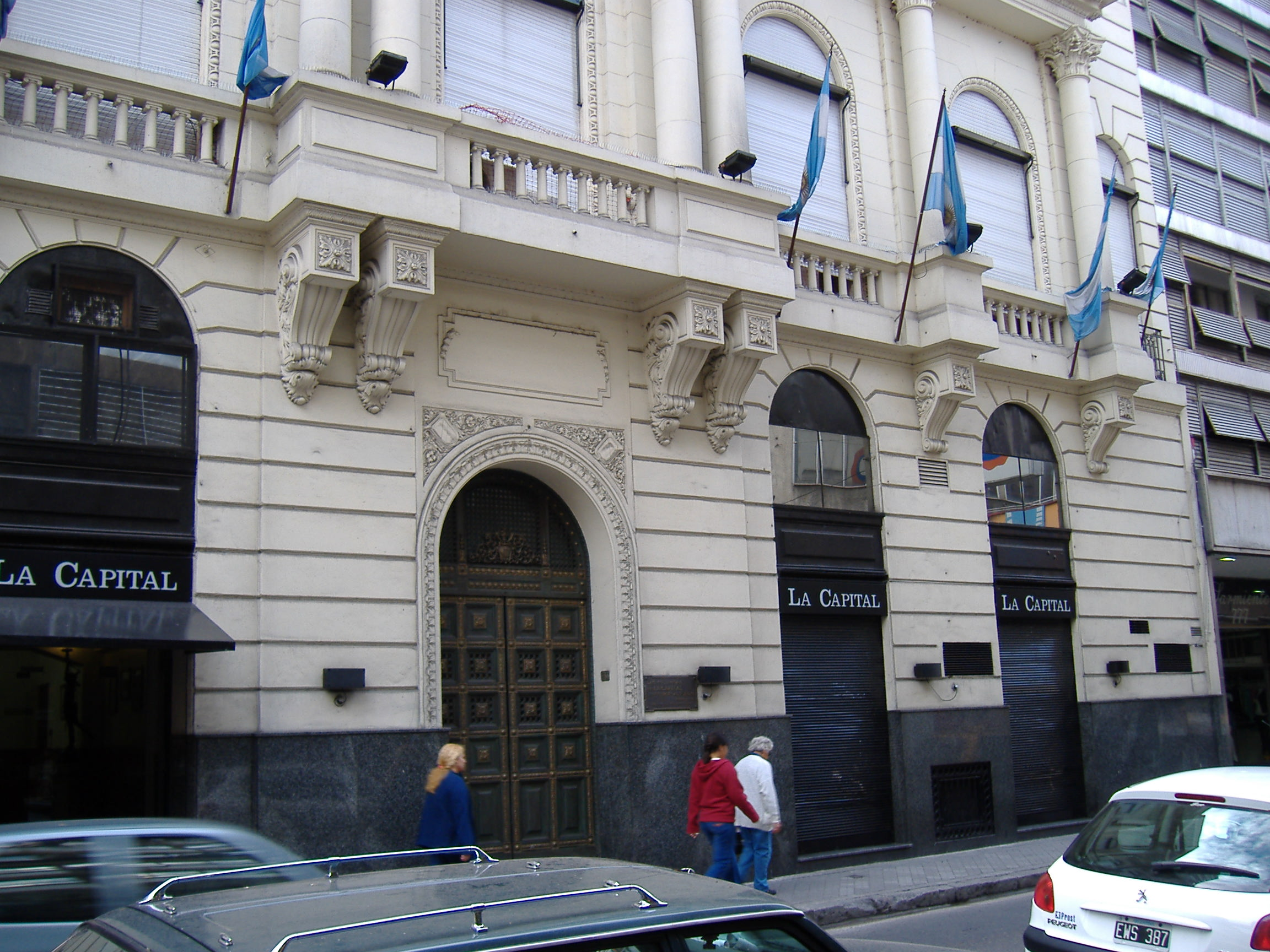
Headquarters of La Capital newspaper

Rosario has two private local television channels, Canal 3 and Canal 5 (the latter is part of the national network Telefé), and a relay station for the public national station, Canal 7 Argentina. There are also three cable TV networks (the national ones Cablevisión and Multicanal, and a local network, Cablehogar), which support two local channels, Canal 4 Noticias and Canal 6.

There are four AM radio stations: three private (licensed by the state) ones, LT3 Radio 2 (LT2), and LT8, and one public, Radio Nacional Rosario, property of the national state. Among the multitude (above 200) of FM stations, some notable ones are FM Vida, Estación del Siglo, FM Del Rosario, Cristal FM, Radio Hollywood, Fisherton-CNN, Continental Rosario, Radio 10 Rosario, Radiofónica, and Clásica Rosario.

The city has three notable newspapers: La Capital (Argentina's oldest newspaper, founded in 1867, and still published today), Rosario/12 (founded in 1991), and El Ciudadano & La Región (founded in 1999).

Rosario is located at the center of Argentina's optical fiber ring. The main data transport companies offer all their services in the city, from public phones to mobile networks and broadband Internet access through DSL, cable modem and Wi-Fi, and including public Internet navigation centers (cybercafes).

About 96% of homes have a domestic telephone line, giving a total of 472,170 lines; cell phone usage has also become pervasive, as happened in Argentina as a whole since the beginning of the 21st century, reaching over 86% of the residents (866,000 mobile lines in July 2004). This demand, boosted by low prices and sale promotions, and coupled with restrictions on the installation of antennas and alleged lack of investment by the providers, sometimes degrades the quality of the service. Most notably, the mobile network collapsed almost completely in the celebrations of Christmas, New Year's Day and Friend's Day in 2004 and 2005.

== Notable people ==
- Antonio Agri (1932–1998), violinist, composer and conductor
- Marcella Althaus-Reid (1952–2009), feminist theologian
- Ariel Belloso (born 1967), electronic musician and record producer
- Alcira Argumedo (1940–2021), politician and academic
- Luciana Aymar, field hockey player
- Clara Alonso (born 1990), actress, singer, and TV hostess
- Felipe Arregui (born 1994), rugby union player
- Juan Carlos Baglietto, singer
- Ana María Cué (born 1941), pianist, poet, and educator
- Gato Barbieri, jazz composer
- Eduardo Barnes (1901–1977), sculptor
- Tomás Baravalle (born 1990), rugby union player
- Octavio Bartolucci (born 1975), rugby union player
- Servando Bayo (1822–1884), politician, governor of the province of Santa Fe
- Antonio J. Benítez (1903–1992), politician
- Emiliano Bergamaschi (born 1976), rugby union player
- Leda Bergonzi (born 1979, charismatic faith healer
- Gustavo Bermúdez (born 1964), actor
- Alberto Di Bernardo (born 1980), rugby union player
- Antonio Berni, painter
- Emilia Bertolé (1896–1949), poet and painter
- Marcelo Bielsa, football coach
- María Eugenia Bielsa Caldera (born 1958), politician
- Rafael Bielsa (born 1953), politician
- Emiliano Boffelli, rugby union player
- José Bonaparte (1928–2020), paleontologist
- Antonio Bonfatti (born 1950), politician
- José Octavio Bordón (born 1945), politician and diplomat
- Nicolás Bossicovich (born 1969), rugby union player
- José Antonio Bottiroli (born 1990), composer and pianist
- Pablo Bouza (born 1973), rugby union player
- Olinda Bozán (1894–1977), actress
- Octavio Brunetti (1975–2014), pianist
- Olga Cabrera Hansen (born 1935), lawyer and activist
- Carlos Alberto César Büsser (1928–2012), naval officer
- Felipe Martinez Carbonell, film director
- Ángel Cappelletti (1927–1995), philosopher
- Manuel Carizza (born 1984), rugby union player
- Hilda Nélida Castañeira de Baccaro (1926–2007), politician
- Mercedes Castellanos de Anchorena (1840-1920), philanthropist and papal marchioness
- Raúl Castells (born 1950), political activist
- Guillermo del Castillo (born 1963), rugby union player
- Fernando del Castillo (born 1971), rugby union player
- Sebastián Chiola (1902–1950), actor
- Gabriel Chumpitaz (born 1976), politician
- Gustavo Cochet (1894–1979), artist
- Eduardo Lastenes Colombres Mármol (1878–1943), marine and diplomat
- Luis Contigiani (born 1972), politician
- Roberto Fidel Ernesto Sorokin Esparza (Coti) (born 1973), musician and composer
- Ángel Correa, football player
- Linda Cristal (1931–2020), American actress
- José Cura, operatic tenor
- Alberto Dalbés (1922–1983), actor
- Alberto Demiddi, rower
- Ángel Di María, football player
- Pablo Echenique (born 1978), Spanish politician
- Noemí Escandell (1942–2019), artist
- Juan Pablo Estelles (born 1988), rugby union player
- Enrique Estévez (born 1983), politician
- Alfonso Delgado Evers (born 1942), Roman Catholic archbishop
- Enrique Ferrarese (1882–1968), Italian-Argentine real estate developer
- Amalia Celia Figueredo de Pietra (1895–1985), aviator
- Alfredo Fiorito (born 1953), DJ
- Lucio Fontana, artist
- Roberto Fontanarrosa, cartoonist
- Adela Forestello (1923–2021), educator and human rights activist
- Juan Francesio (born 1975), rugby union player
- Susana Freyre (born 1929), actress
- Renata Fronzi (1925–2008), Brazilian actress
- Marcelo Frusin (born 1967), comic book artist
- Jerónimo de la Fuente (born 1991), rugby union player
- María Esther Gamas (1911–2006), actress
- Ante Garmaz (1928–2011), actor, fashion designer and model
- Mario Gerosa (born 1967), rugby union player
- Luciana Geuna (born 1977), journalist
- Walter De Giusti (1962-1998), serial killer
- Rubén Giustiniani (born 1955), politician
- Alberto Gollán (1918–2014), media businessperson
- Daniel Gollan (born 1955), cardiologist and politician
- Alejandro Gómez (1908–2005), lawyer and educator
- Elpidio González (1875–1951), politician
- Josefina González (born 1976), human rights activist and politician
- Angélica Gorodischer, writer
- Darío Grandinetti, actor
- Perlita Greco (1906–2001), American actress
- Che Guevara, (1928–1967) revolutionary
- Ángel Guido (1896–1960), architect, engineer, and writer
- Beatriz Guido (1922–1988), novelist and screenwriter
- Hugo Gutiérrez, football player
- Mónica Gutiérrez (born 1955), journalist
- Karen Hallberg (born 1964), physicist
- Jana Rodriguez Hertz, mathematician
- Mauro Icardi, football player
- Dan Isaack (born 1990), rugby union player
- Juan Imhoff, rugby union player
- Enio Iommi (1926–2013), sculptor
- Donald Jay Irwin (1926–2013), politician
- Ezequiel Jurado (born 1973), rugby union player
- Alicia Kozameh (born 1953), writer
- Diego Krapf (born 1973), Argentine-Israeli physicist
- Luisa Lallana, dockworker
- Alberto Laiseca, writer
- Libertad Lamarque, actress
- Juan Carlos Lamas (1921–2004), actor
- Carlos López Puccio (born 1946), musician
- Luis Machín, actor
- Giovanni Lo Celso, football player
- Gerardo Martino, football player and coach
- Valeria Mazza, model
- Nelly Meden (1928–2004), actress
- Yamile Saied Mendez, writer
- César Luis Menotti, football coach
- Lionel Messi (born 1987), football player
- Oscar Moro (1948–2006), drummer
- Juan de los Angeles Naranjo (1897–1952), painter and draughtsman
- Litto Nebbia (born 1948), musician and producer
- Nina Negri (1901–1981), painter and engraver
- Nicki Nicole (born 2000), singer and songwriter
- Agustín Ojeda (born 2004), professional footballer
- Alberto Olmedo, actor/comedian
- José Orengo (born 1976), rugby union player
- Jorge Orta (born 1953), Italian-Argentinian visual artist
- Fito Páez, singer-songwriter
- Ricardo Paganini, rugby union player
- Inés Palombo (born 1985), actress and model
- Raquel Partnoy (born 1932), artist and writer
- Pierina Pasotti (1902–1996), Argentine geologist, geographer and professor
- Pachu Peña (born 1962), comedian and actor
- Raúl Norberto Pérez (born 1965), rugby union player
- Anselmo Piccoli (1915–1992), Abstract artist
- Juan Pitinari (born 1995), rugby union player
- Sebastian Plano (born 1985), cellist, composer, and producer
- Norma Pons (1942–2014), actress and vedette
- Patricio Pron, writer
- Federico Pucciariello (born 1975), rugby union player
- Guido Randisi (born 1989), rugby union player
- Antonela Roccuzzo (born 1988), Lionel Messi´s wife. Social media "personality"
- Martín Rodríguez (born 1985), rugby union player
- Alejandra Rodenas (born 1963), lawyer and politician
- Maximiliano Rodríguez, football player
- Felipe Romito (1893-1962), singer
- Carlos Alberto Scolari (born 1963), academic
- Leonardo Senatore, rugby union player
- Federico Todeschini (born 1975), rugby union player
- Victoria Torni (1893–1977), de facto First Lady of Argentina between 1944 and 1946
- Tomás Vallejos (born 1984), rugby union player
- Marta Inés Varela (born 1943), composer, pianist, and teacher
- Nicolás Vergallo (born 1983), rugby union player
- Dorothy Wrinch, mathematician and biochemical theorist

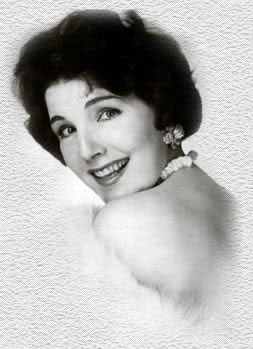
Libertad Lamarque

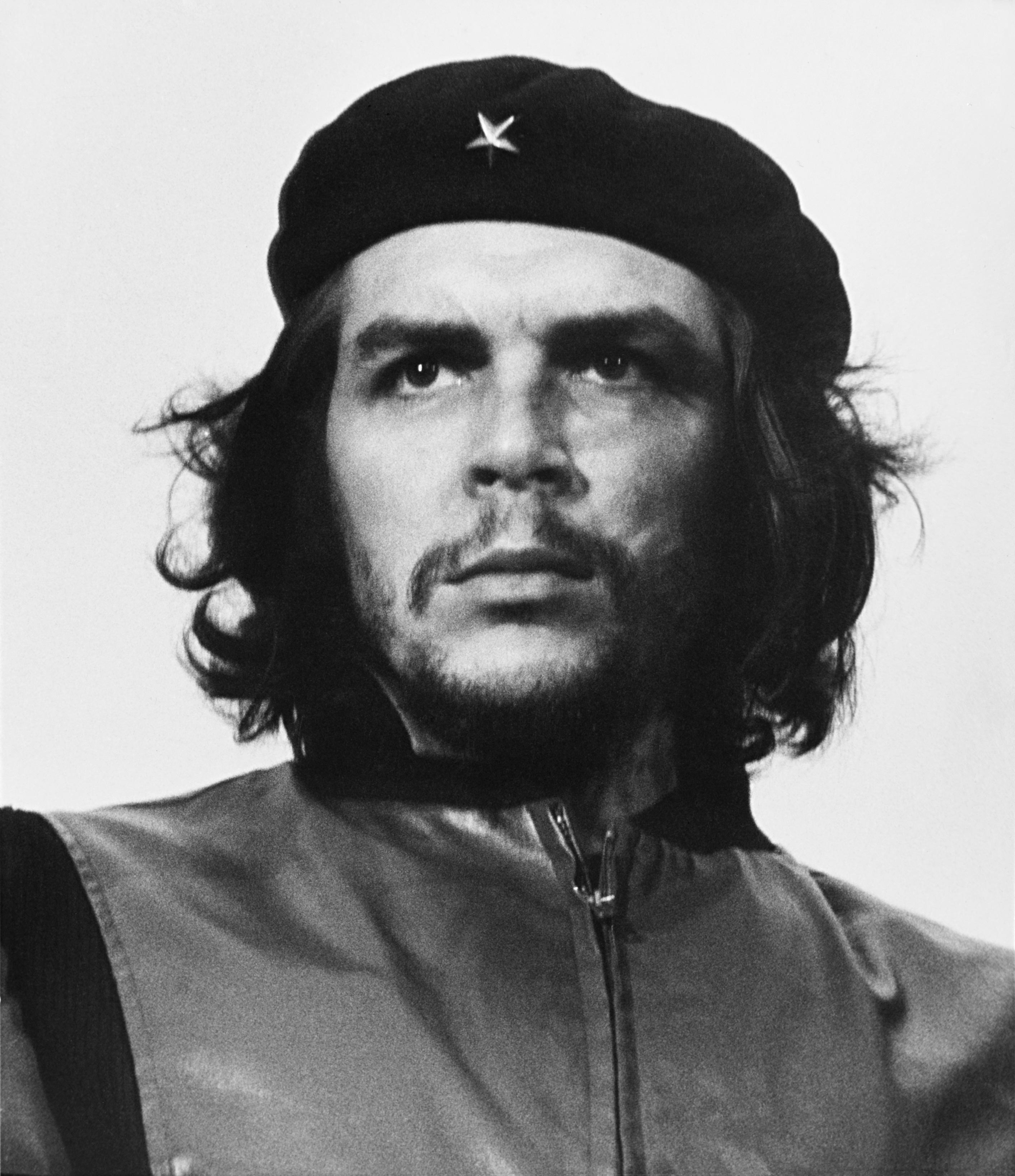
Che Guevara

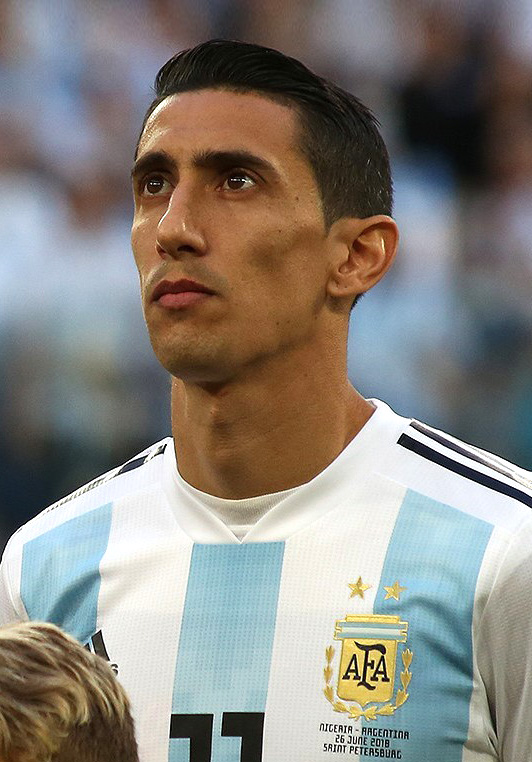
Ángel Di María

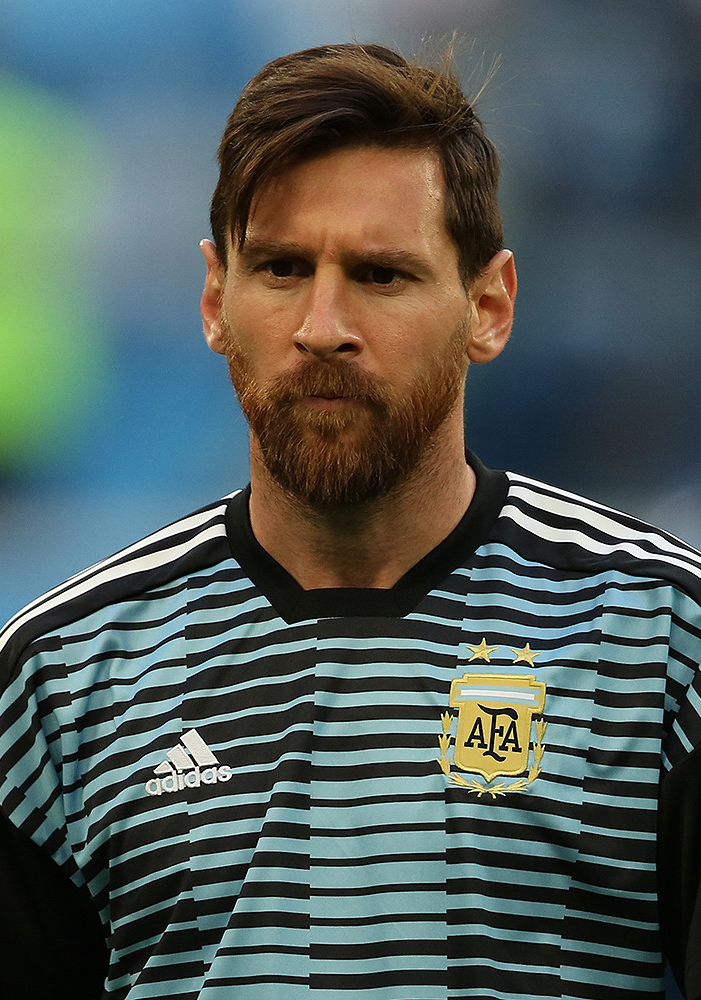
Lionel Messi

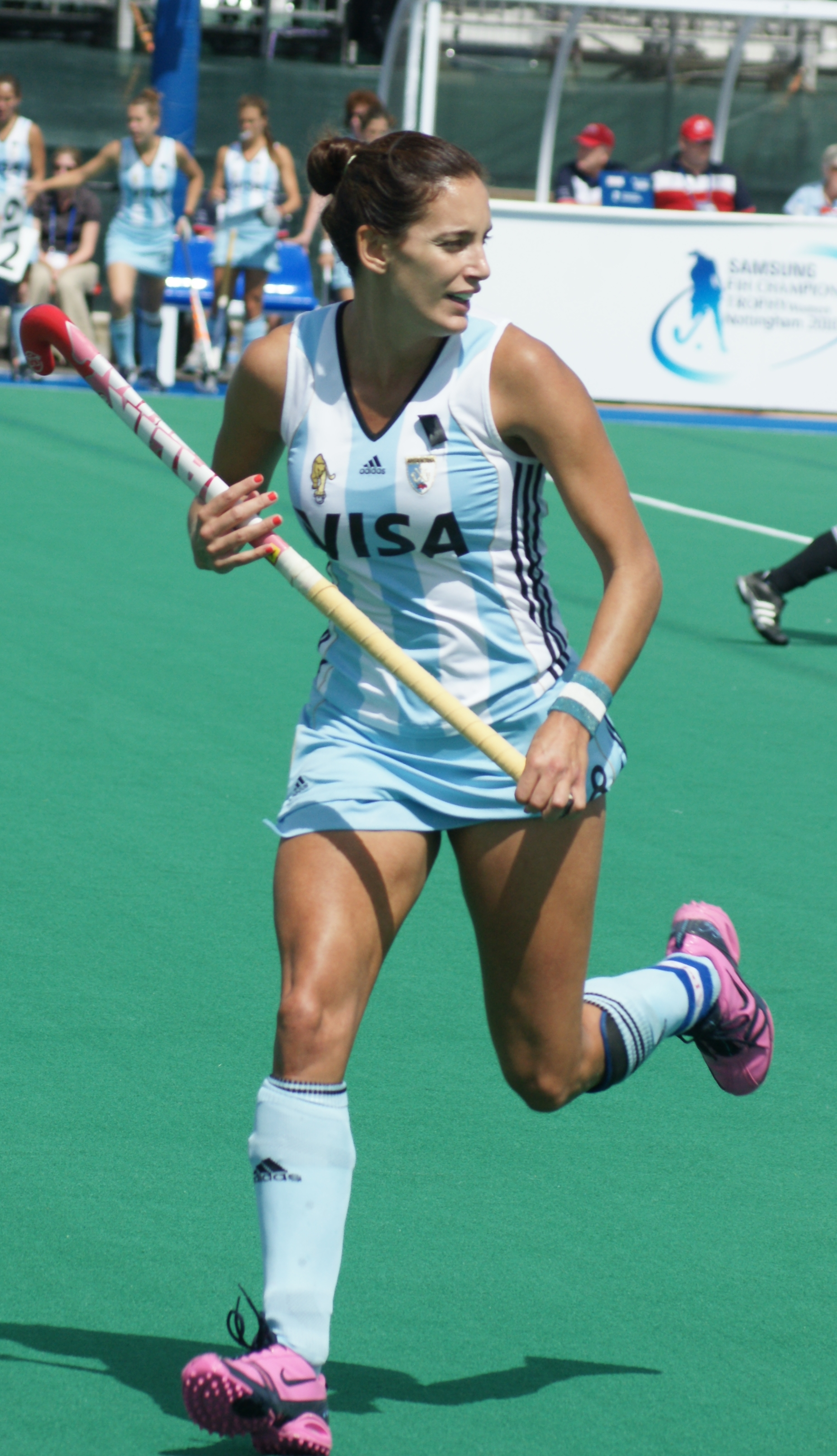
Luciana Aymar

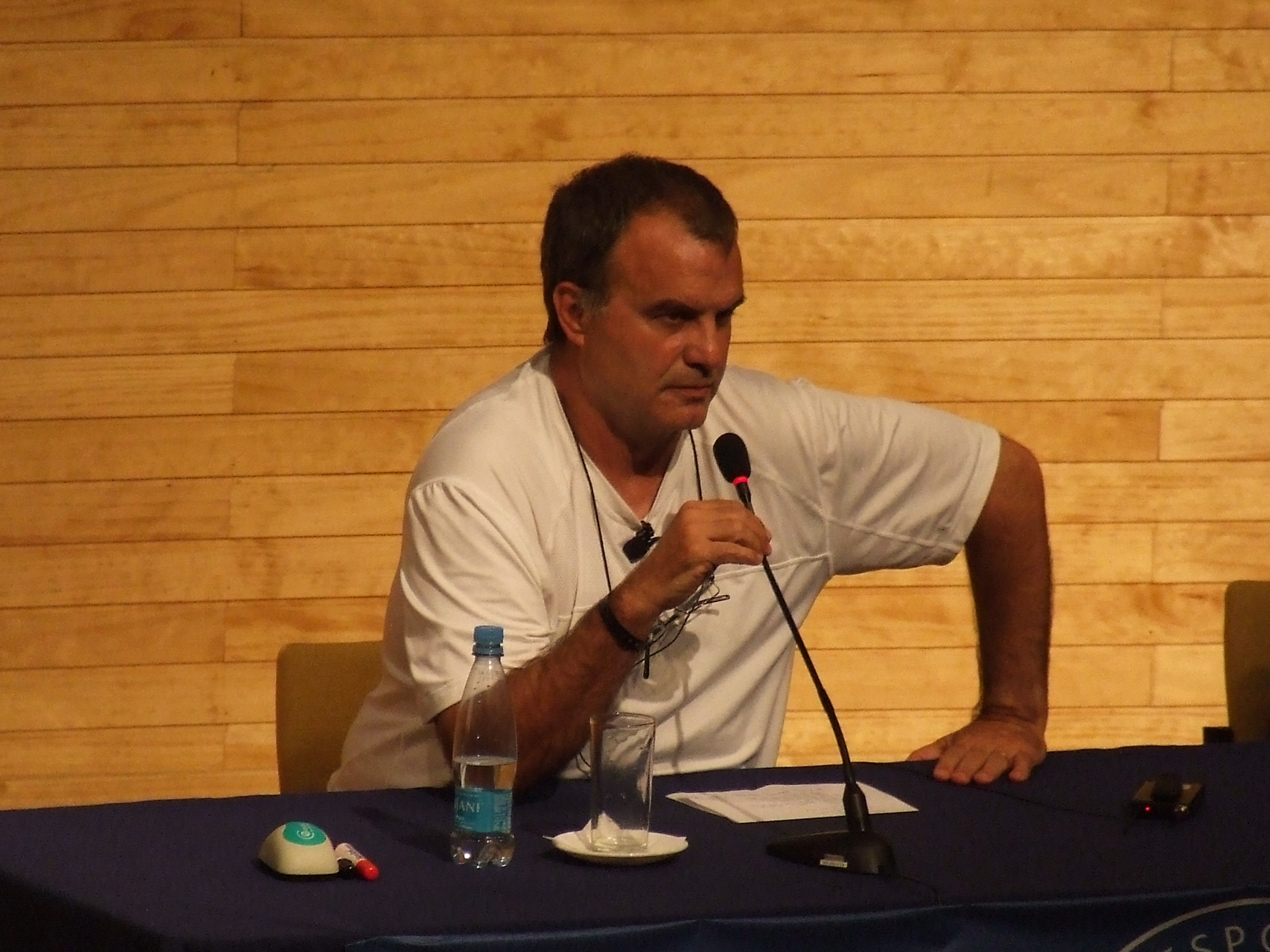
Marcelo Bielsa

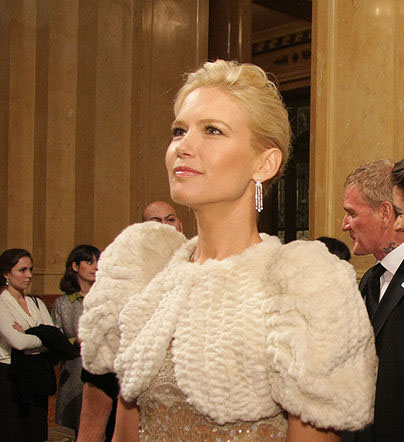
Valeria Mazza

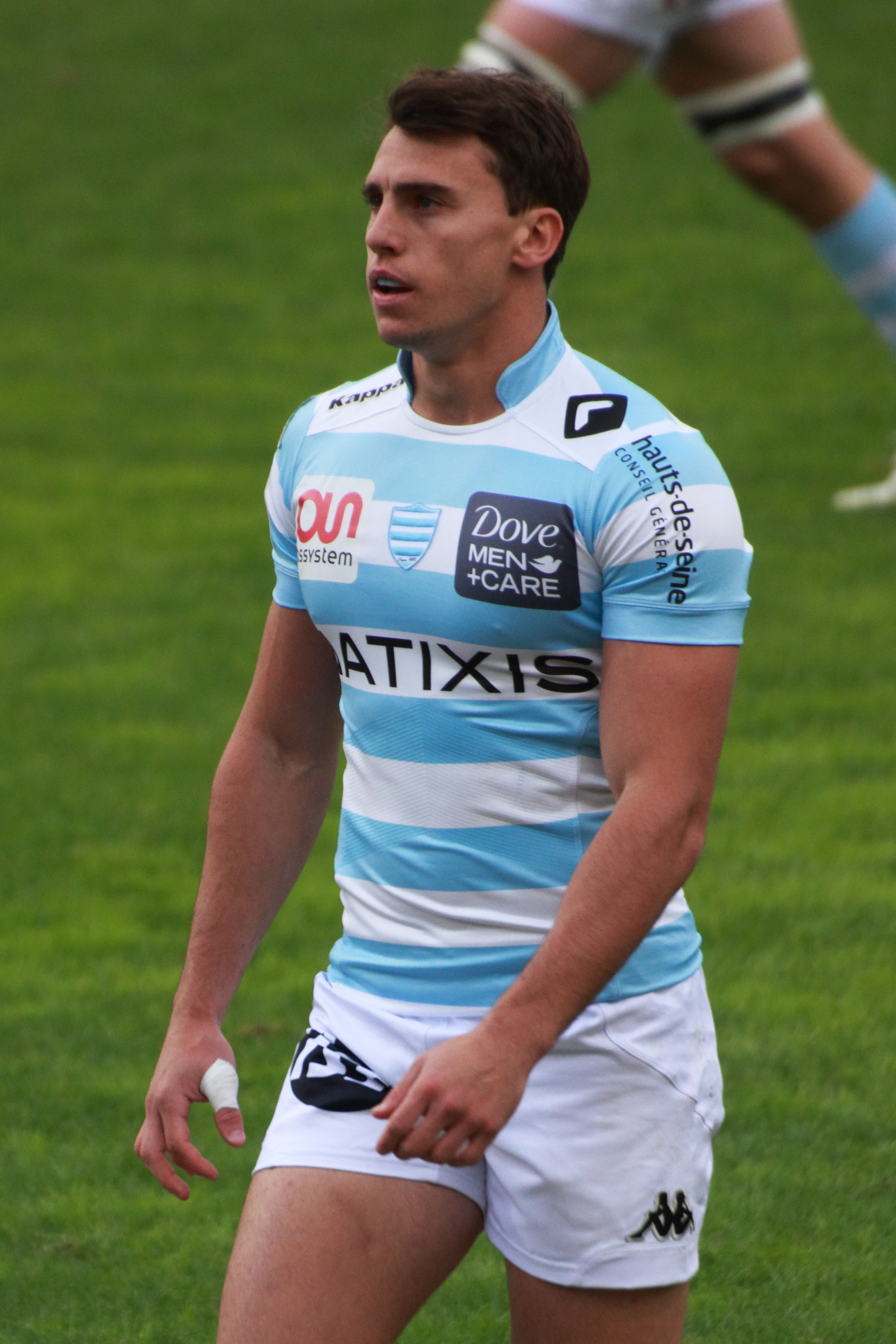
Juan Imhoff

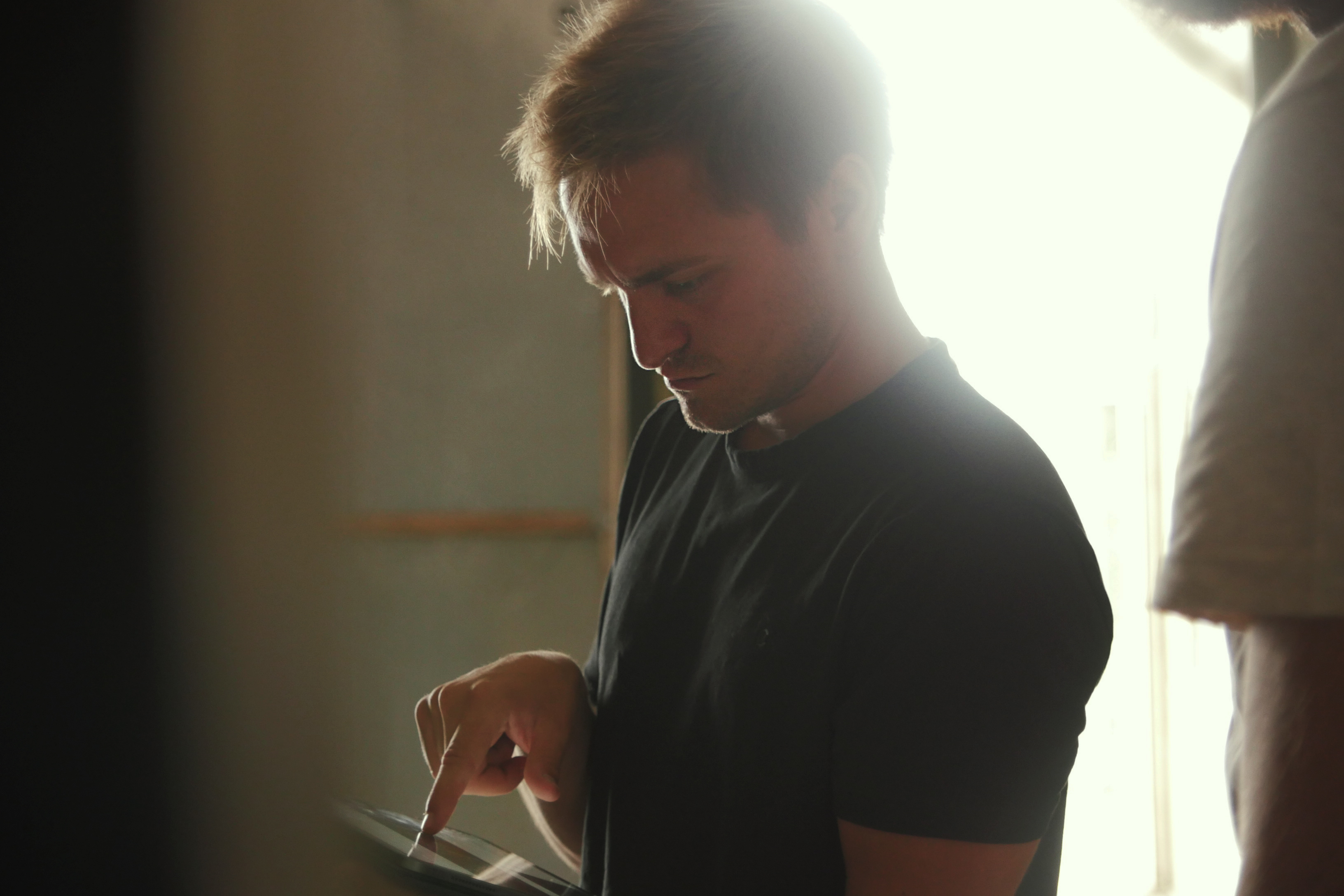
Felipe Martinez Carbonell

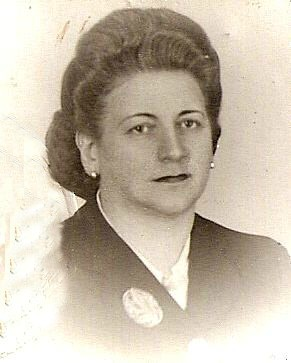
Victoria Torni

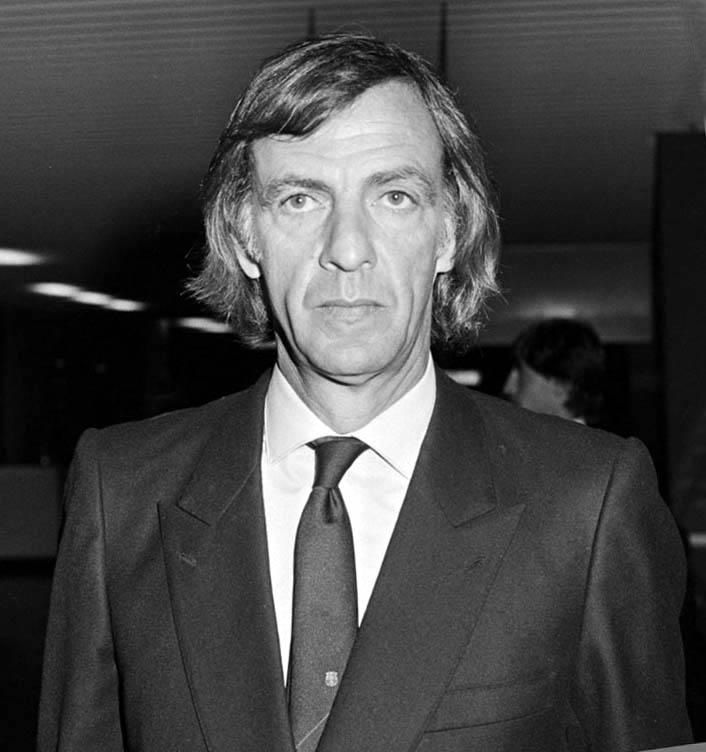
César Luis Menotti

== Twin towns – sister cities ==
Rosario is twinned with:

- Alessandria, Italy
- Almaty, Kazakhstan
- Asunción, Paraguay
- Bilbao, Spain
- Caracas, Venezuela
- Cuenca, Ecuador
- Dakar, Senegal
- Haifa, Israel
- Imperia, Italy
- Kuwait City, Kuwait
- Manizales, Colombia
- Medellín, Colombia
- Monterrey, Mexico
- Montevideo, Uruguay
- Piraeus, Greece
- Pisco, Peru
- Porto Alegre, Brazil
- Shanghai, China
- Santa Clara, Cuba
- Santa Cruz de la Sierra, Bolivia
- Santiago de Cuba, Cuba
- Santo Domingo, Dominican Republic
- St. Louis, United States
- Turin, Italy
- Valparaíso, Chile

=== Cooperation agreements ===
Rosario also cooperates with:

- Viña del Mar, Chile

== See also ==
- History of Rosario
- Port of Rosario
- Geography of Rosario
- Government of Rosario
- Districts of Rosario
- Olinto Gallo Workshops
- Palacio Cabanellas
- Rondeau Boulevard
- 2013 Rosario gas explosion
- Fernando Traverso's Bicis
