= Geography of Rosario =

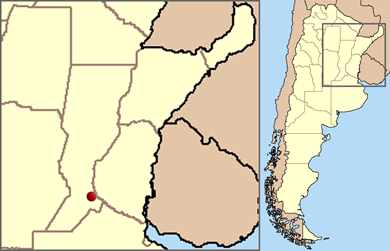
Location of Rosario within the province and the country.

Rosario is the largest city of the province of Santa Fe, Argentina, and the third most populous in the country, after Córdoba and Buenos Aires. It is located about 300 km (190 mi) north of Buenos Aires, on the Western shore of the Paraná River, and it has about 910,000 inhabitants. It is surrounded by smaller cities and towns that form a metropolitan area (Greater Rosario) with a population of about 1.2 million according to the 2001 census [INDEC].

== Geographic data ==
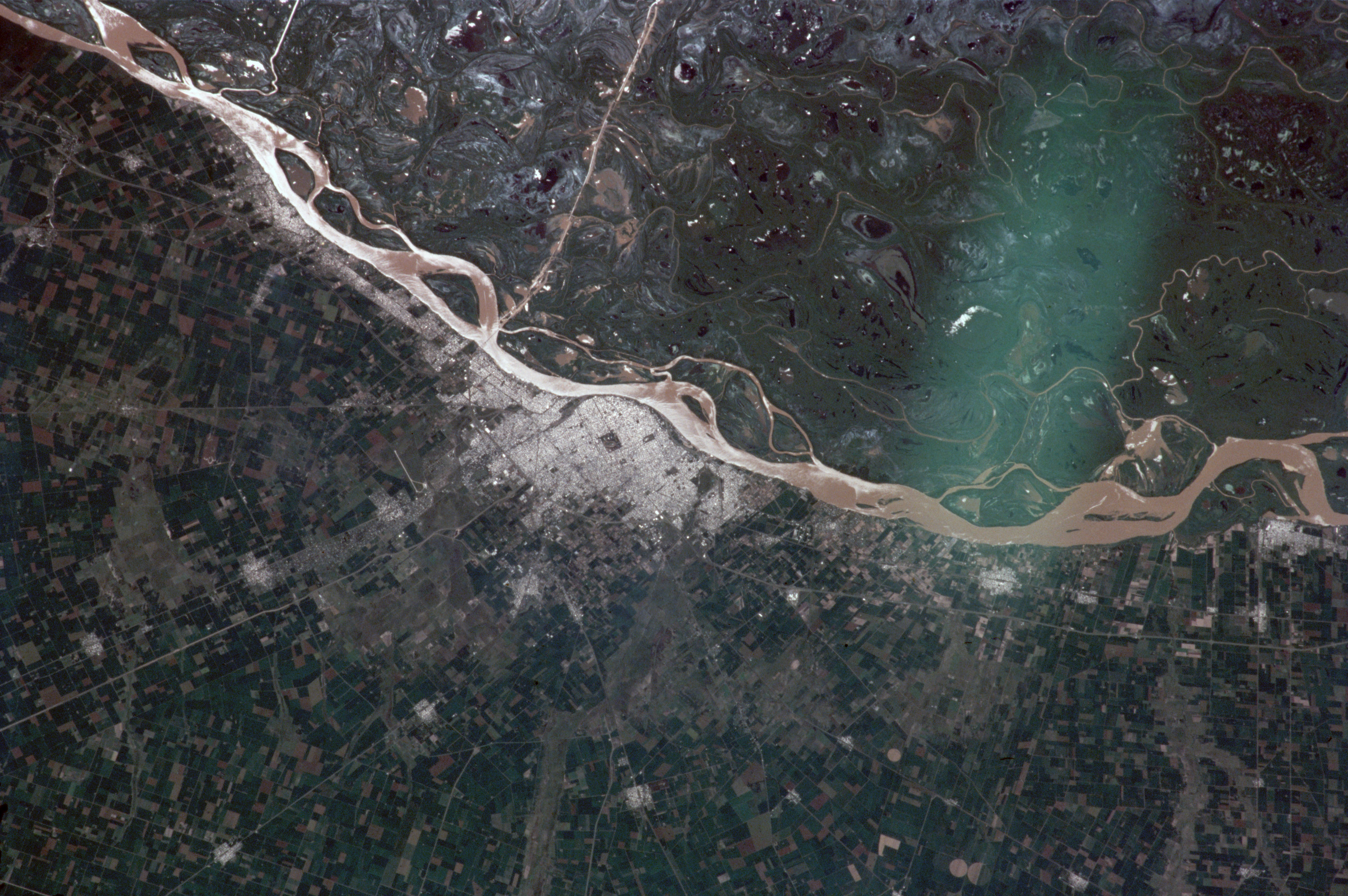
Rosario and the neighbouring areas along the Paraná River from space. Note the Rosario-Victoria Bridge.

The municipality of Rosario measures 178.69 square kilometres (68.99 sq mi) (not all of them are fully urbanized). Its extreme points are:

- Latitude: parallels 32° 52′ 18″ and 33° 02′ 22″ South
- Longitude: meridians 60° 36′ 44″ and 60° 47′ 46″ West

The geographical center is approximately at 32°57′2″S 60°42′15″W.

The city is located on a smoothly undulated plain typical of the Pampas, between 22.5 and 24.6 metres above mean sea level; the original settlement rests on the ravine on the right-hand shore of the Paraná, opposite a group of islands of the Paraná Delta which are partly in the jurisdiction of the province of Entre Ríos. The nearest city across the river's flood plain (60 km) is Victoria, Entre Ríos, linked to Rosario by the Rosario-Victoria Bridge.

== Climate and natural hazards ==
The Rosario area has a Pampean temperate climate. There is a hot season from November to March (with temperature extremes between 18 and 32 °C), and a cold season between June and mid-August (between 5 and 16 °C). Summer is rainier than winter. Local residents often complain about high levels of humidity throughout the year.

The last instance of snow was in the winter of 1973, being clearly an exceptional phenomenon (hail is not, though it is also quite rare).

Parts of the city are subject to flooding, but large events have historically been exceptional. The possibility of serious earthquakes is also remote, and other hazards such as hurricanes and volcanic eruptions are virtually impossible.

Climate data for Rosario – Islas Malvinas International Airport (1981–2010, extremes 1875–present)
Month	Jan	Feb	Mar	Apr	May	Jun	Jul	Aug	Sep	Oct	Nov	Dec	Year
Record high °C (°F)	40.5 (104.9)	39.3 (102.7)	37.0 (98.6)	33.8 (92.8)	32.9 (91.2)	29.0 (84.2)	31.6 (88.9)	36.1 (97.0)	37.3 (99.1)	37.7 (99.9)	37.6 (99.7)	40.3 (104.5)	40.5 (104.9)
Mean daily maximum °C (°F)	30.8 (87.4)	29.2 (84.6)	27.4 (81.3)	23.5 (74.3)	19.9 (67.8)	16.6 (61.9)	16.2 (61.2)	18.9 (66.0)	20.9 (69.6)	24.2 (75.6)	27.1 (80.8)	29.6 (85.3)	23.7 (74.7)
Daily mean °C (°F)	24.6 (76.3)	23.2 (73.8)	21.4 (70.5)	17.3 (63.1)	13.8 (56.8)	10.7 (51.3)	10.0 (50.0)	12.1 (53.8)	14.5 (58.1)	18.1 (64.6)	21.0 (69.8)	23.4 (74.1)	17.5 (63.5)
Mean daily minimum °C (°F)	18.4 (65.1)	17.5 (63.5)	16.0 (60.8)	12.1 (53.8)	8.7 (47.7)	6.0 (42.8)	4.8 (40.6)	6.2 (43.2)	8.3 (46.9)	12.0 (53.6)	14.7 (58.5)	17.2 (63.0)	11.8 (53.2)
Record low °C (°F)	7.0 (44.6)	5.0 (41.0)	3.0 (37.4)	−0.9 (30.4)	−6.1 (21.0)	−7.8 (18.0)	−6.9 (19.6)	−7.8 (18.0)	−4.8 (23.4)	−1.2 (29.8)	1.8 (35.2)	5.1 (41.2)	−7.8 (18.0)
Average precipitation mm (inches)	111.8 (4.40)	120.6 (4.75)	144.8 (5.70)	111.8 (4.40)	59.0 (2.32)	27.7 (1.09)	24.7 (0.97)	32.4 (1.28)	47.4 (1.87)	108.5 (4.27)	112.3 (4.42)	120.6 (4.75)	1,021.6 (40.22)
Average precipitation days (≥ 0.1 mm)	7.9	7.6	8.1	8.2	5.2	4.7	4.1	4.2	5.3	8.9	8.6	9.4	82.2
Average relative humidity (%)	68.2	73.7	77.2	80.0	81.1	82.2	79.6	74.7	70.6	70.4	67.9	67.2	74.4
Mean monthly sunshine hours	313.1	271.2	244.9	216.0	189.1	150.0	164.3	201.5	201.0	232.5	270.0	291.4	2,745
Percentage possible sunshine	73	71	64	64	58	50	52	59	56	58	65	65	61
Source 1: Servicio Meteorológico Nacional
Source 2: Meteo Climat (record highs and lows), Oficina de Riesgo Agropecuario (March, April, October, November and December record high, and July, September, October and December record low), UNLP (sun only)

Climate data for Rosario – Islas Malvinas International Airport (1961–1990)
Month	Jan	Feb	Mar	Apr	May	Jun	Jul	Aug	Sep	Oct	Nov	Dec	Year
Mean daily maximum °C (°F)	30.8 (87.4)	29.5 (85.1)	27.0 (80.6)	23.4 (74.1)	20.2 (68.4)	16.5 (61.7)	16.4 (61.5)	18.3 (64.9)	20.7 (69.3)	23.6 (74.5)	26.6 (79.9)	29.5 (85.1)	23.5 (74.3)
Daily mean °C (°F)	24.2 (75.6)	23.1 (73.6)	20.8 (69.4)	17.1 (62.8)	13.7 (56.7)	10.3 (50.5)	10.3 (50.5)	11.5 (52.7)	13.9 (57.0)	17.3 (63.1)	20.3 (68.5)	23.0 (73.4)	17.1 (62.8)
Mean daily minimum °C (°F)	17.7 (63.9)	17.0 (62.6)	15.2 (59.4)	11.7 (53.1)	8.3 (46.9)	5.3 (41.5)	5.3 (41.5)	5.7 (42.3)	7.6 (45.7)	10.9 (51.6)	13.8 (56.8)	16.4 (61.5)	11.2 (52.2)
Average precipitation mm (inches)	104.5 (4.11)	116.4 (4.58)	164.6 (6.48)	79.7 (3.14)	46.7 (1.84)	36.6 (1.44)	36.8 (1.45)	36.7 (1.44)	61.6 (2.43)	91.8 (3.61)	98.3 (3.87)	120.0 (4.72)	993.7 (39.12)
Average precipitation days (≥ 0.1 mm)	9	8	9	7	6	5	5	5	6	9	9	9	87
Average relative humidity (%)	69	72	78	81	82	82	82	77	74	73	70	68	76
Source 1: NOAA
Source 2: Servicio Meteorológico Nacional (precipitation days)

== Urban structure ==
=== Central district ===
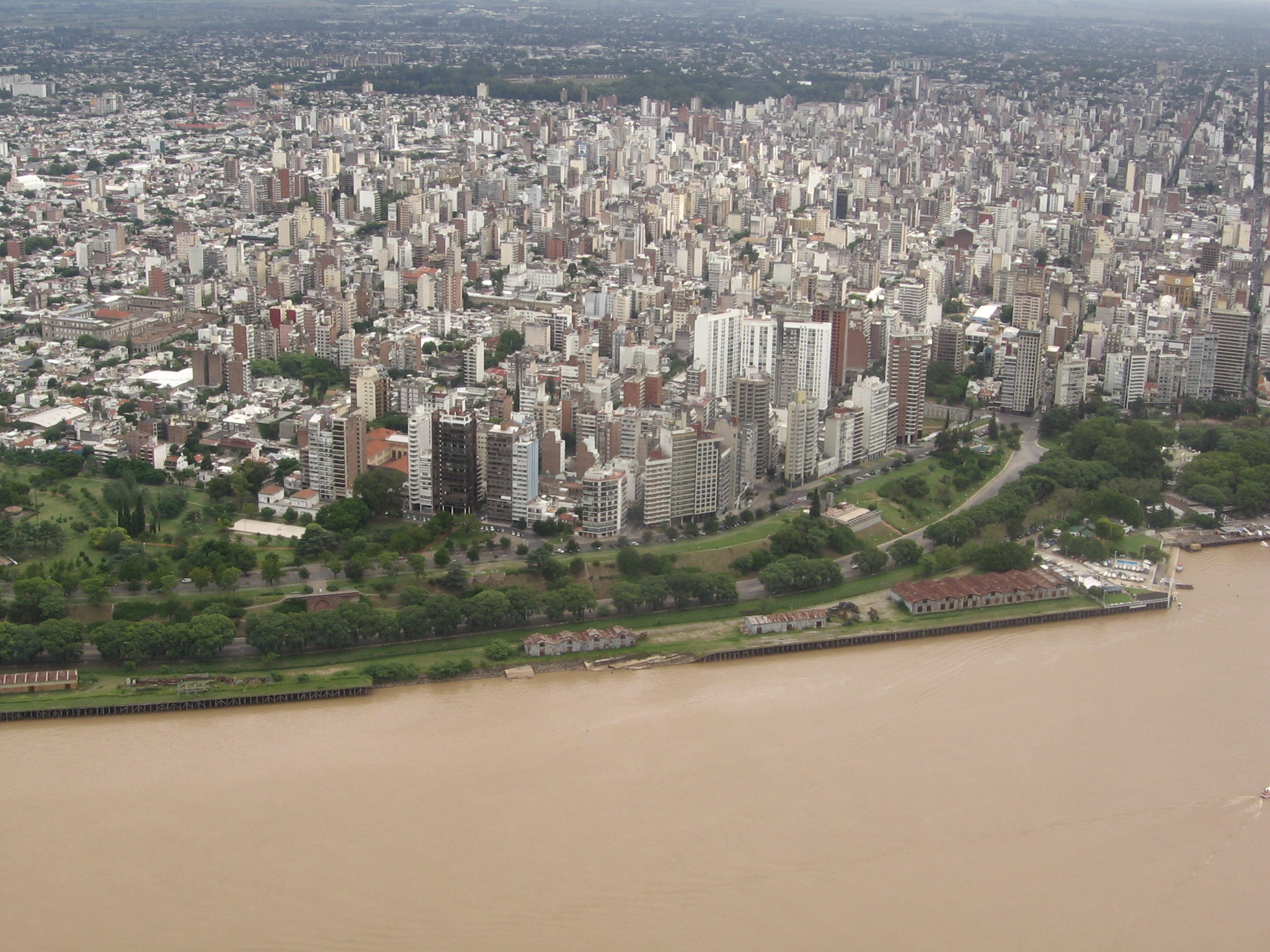
Rosario viewed from a point above the Paraná River

Rosario lies on the tall ravine of the right-hand shore of the Paraná River, in a place where the ravine separates from the river and there is a natural slope to the low shore, known as Bajada Sargento Cabral (after sergeant Juan Bautista Cabral, who died during the Battle of San Lorenzo). For a long time this was the only access to the port, until several cuts were made in the walls of the ravine.

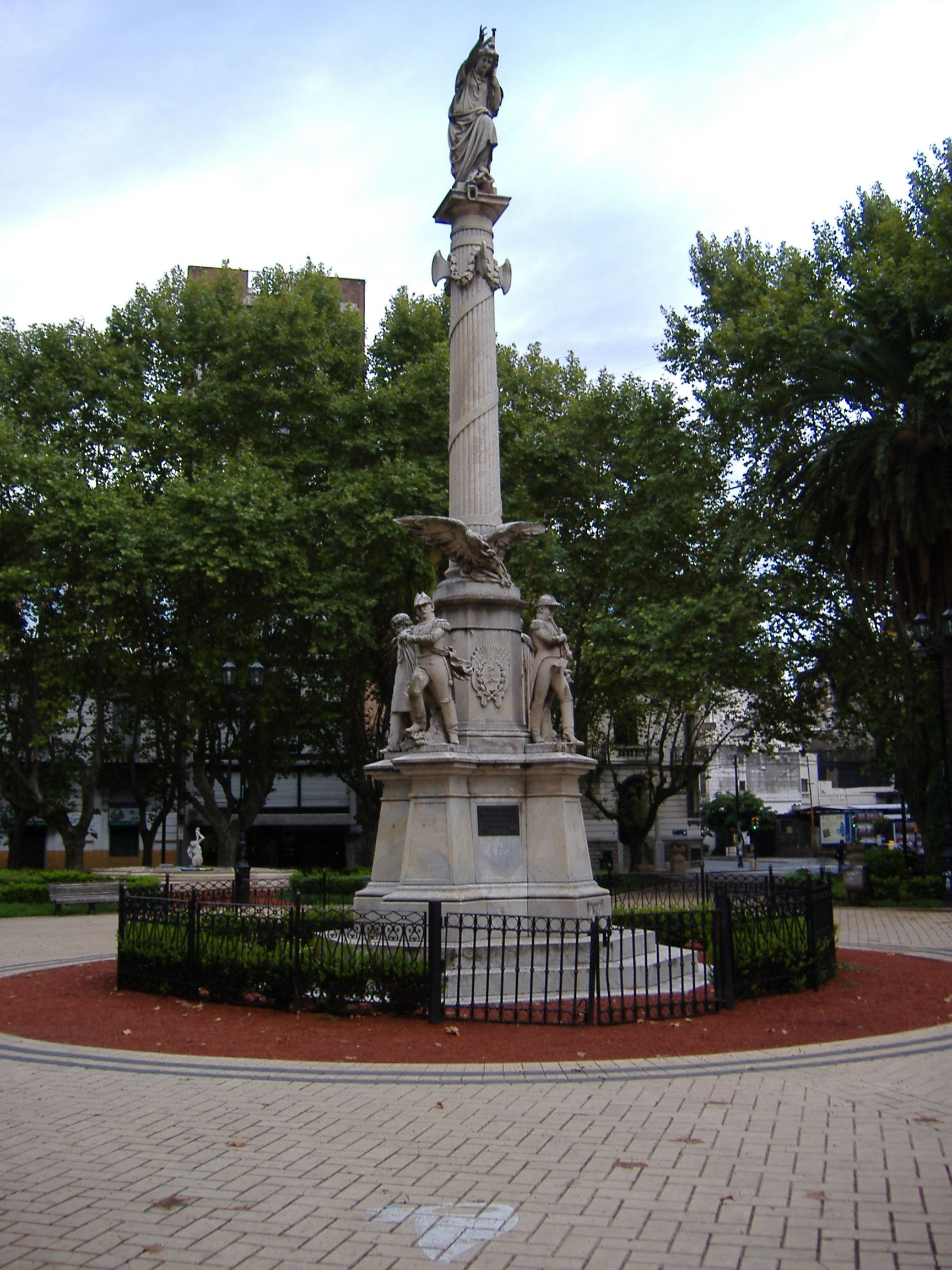
Plaza 25 de Mayo

The point of origin of the city is the Plaza 25 de Mayo ("25 May Square"), now surrounded by the Municipality (Palacio de los Leones), the Basilica Cathedral of Our Lady of the Rosary, the Central Post Office building, the Decorative Art Museum and the emblematic building called La Bola de Nieve ("The Snowball"). The streets follow a remarkably regular pattern called damero (a checkerboard grid), except in the zone around the Bajada Sargento Cabral, where the streets are somewhat more irregular due to terrain features.

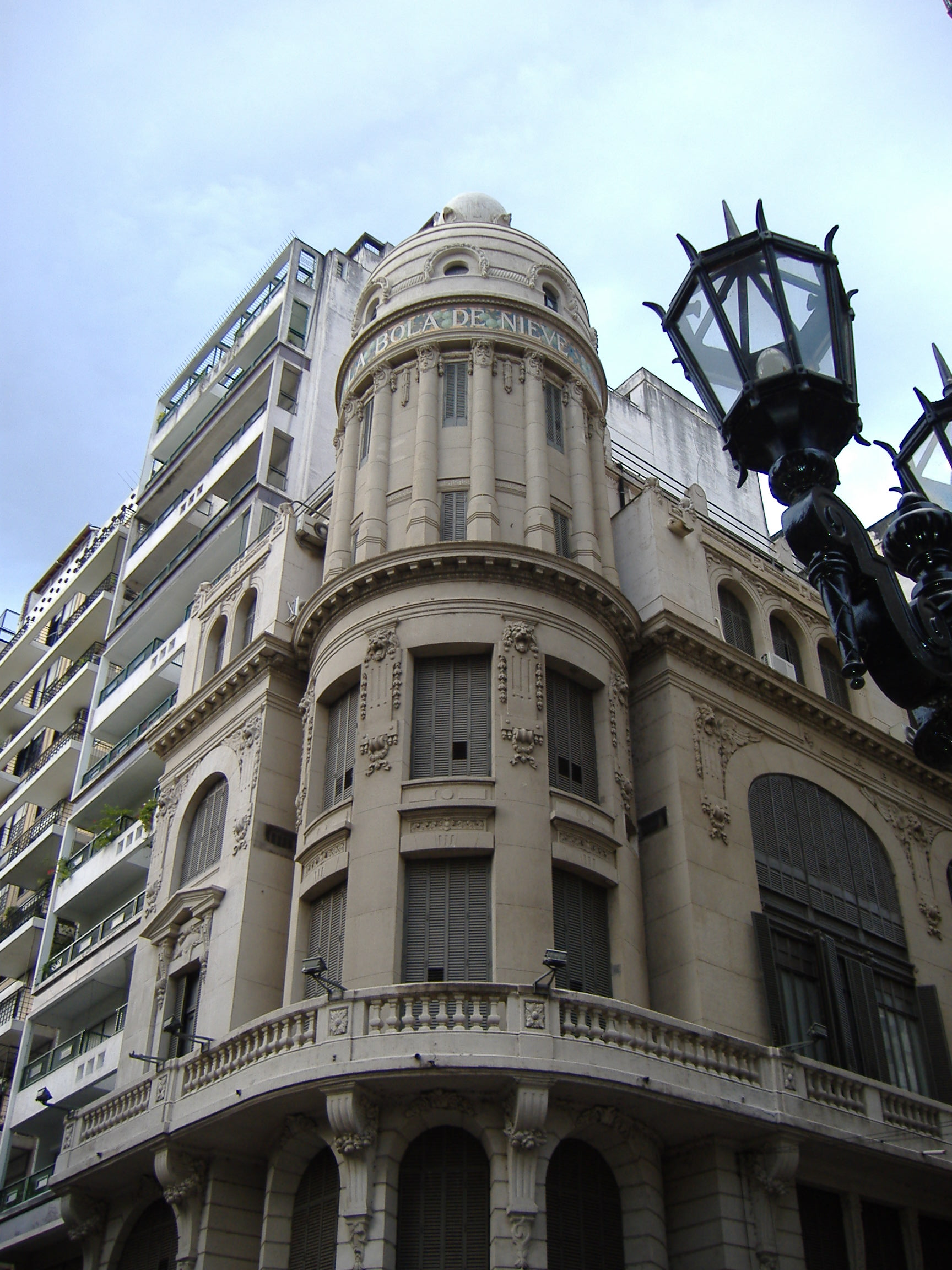
La Bola de Nieve

Two main arteries are to be noted in Rosario's urban structure: Oroño Boulevard, going from north to south, and Pellegrini Avenue, from east to west. These streets, together with the river, mark the boundaries of the town center. Their characters are rather different. Oroño has an air of distinction, it is flanked by old buildings and mansions, and it has a wide central reservation that is profusely hoisted, with a walking path devoted to pedestrians and cyclists. Pellegrini is wide and noisy, with a high flow of transit; it is one of the commercial centers of the city, where numerous restaurants and ice-cream shops can be found. The beginning of Pellegrini Ave. is flanked by an important public park, the Parque Urquiza.

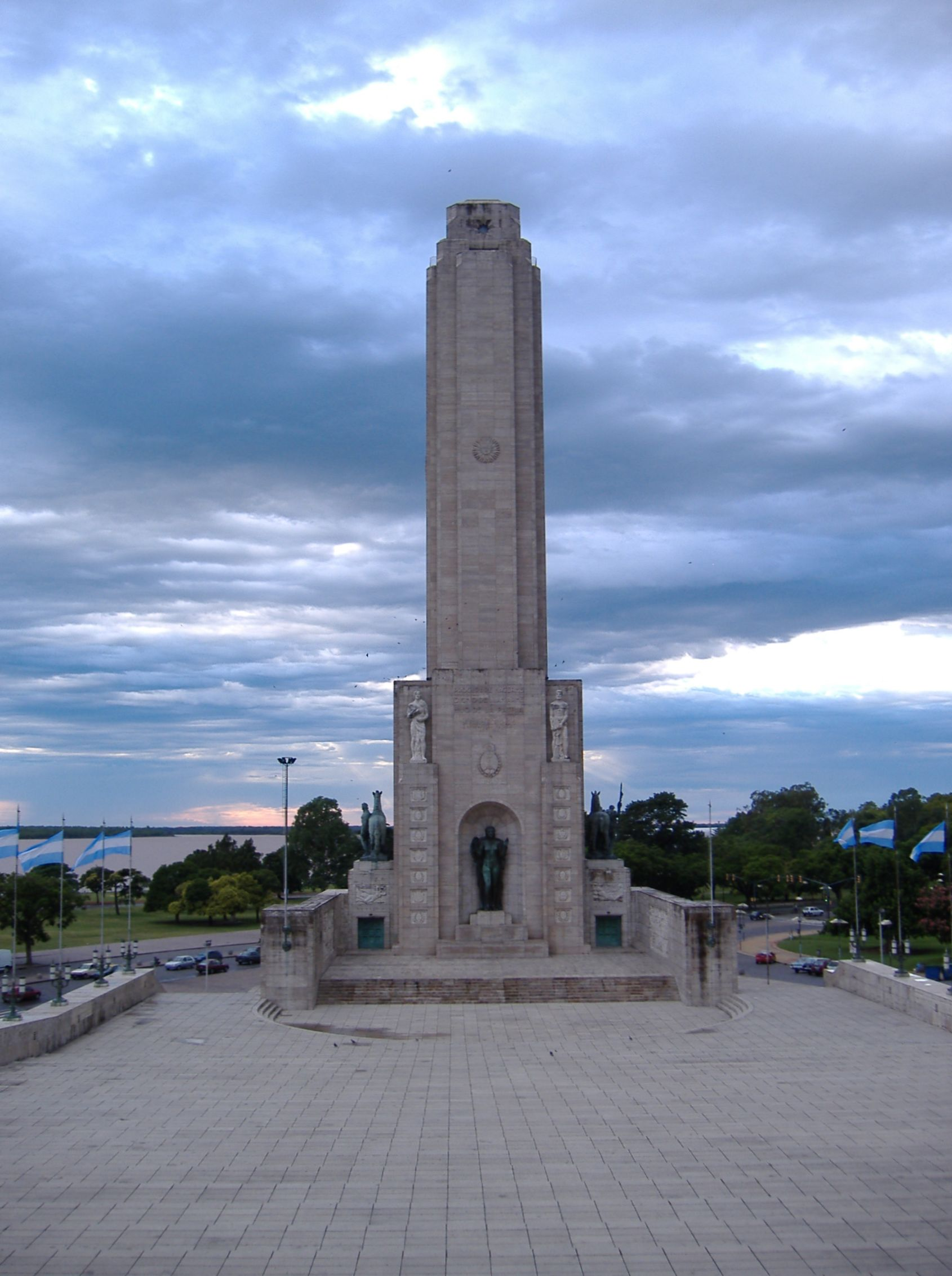
The National Flag Memorial

Downtown, Córdoba Street is the main one. Córdoba begins in the park surrounding the National Flag Memorial (probably the single most recognizable landmark in the city), goes up to the city center, and it becomes a pedestrian walk for seven blocks, between Plaza 25 de Mayo and Plaza Pringles. Along Córdoba to the west there is the Paseo del Siglo ("Walk of the Century"), thus called because the houses of the wealthiest families of Rosario at the beginning of the 20th century can be found along Córdoba, from Plaza Pringles to Oroño Boulevard. On Córdoba Street there is also Plaza San Martín, surrounded by buildings that formerly housed the Tribunals and the Police, and now the seats of universities, museums and the delegation of the provincial government.

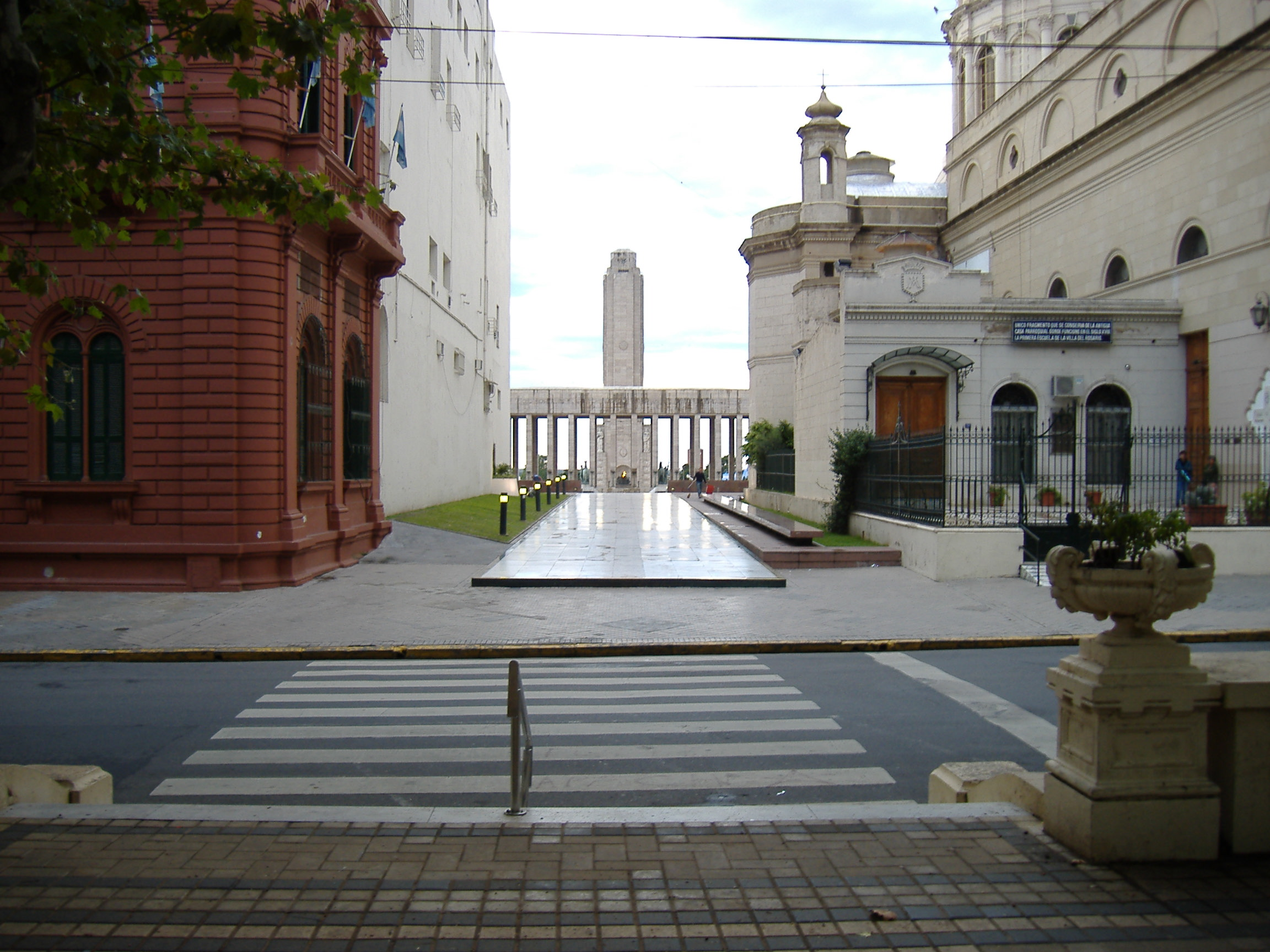
Pasaje Juramento, viewed from Plaza 25 de Mayo

Out of Plaza 25 de Mayo, towards the river, between the cathedral and the municipal building, there is Pasaje Juramento ("Oath Passage"), leading to the Flag Memorial.

Also in the town center there is Peatonal San Martín (the pedestrian-only four blocks of San Martín Street, from Peatonal Córdoba south up to Mendoza Street), and two large open squares, Plaza Montenegro and Plaza Sarmiento, among other important spots. Other important commercial streets are Corrientes, San Luis and Santa Fe.

At the confluence of Oroño and Pellegrini starts the Parque de la Independencia ("Independence Park"), that houses the Juan B. Castagnino Fine Arts Museum, the Newell's Old Boys football club, and the sports clubs Provincial and Gimnasia y Esgrima, as well as the horse racetrack and the former Sociedad Rural (Rural Society).

=== Periphery ===
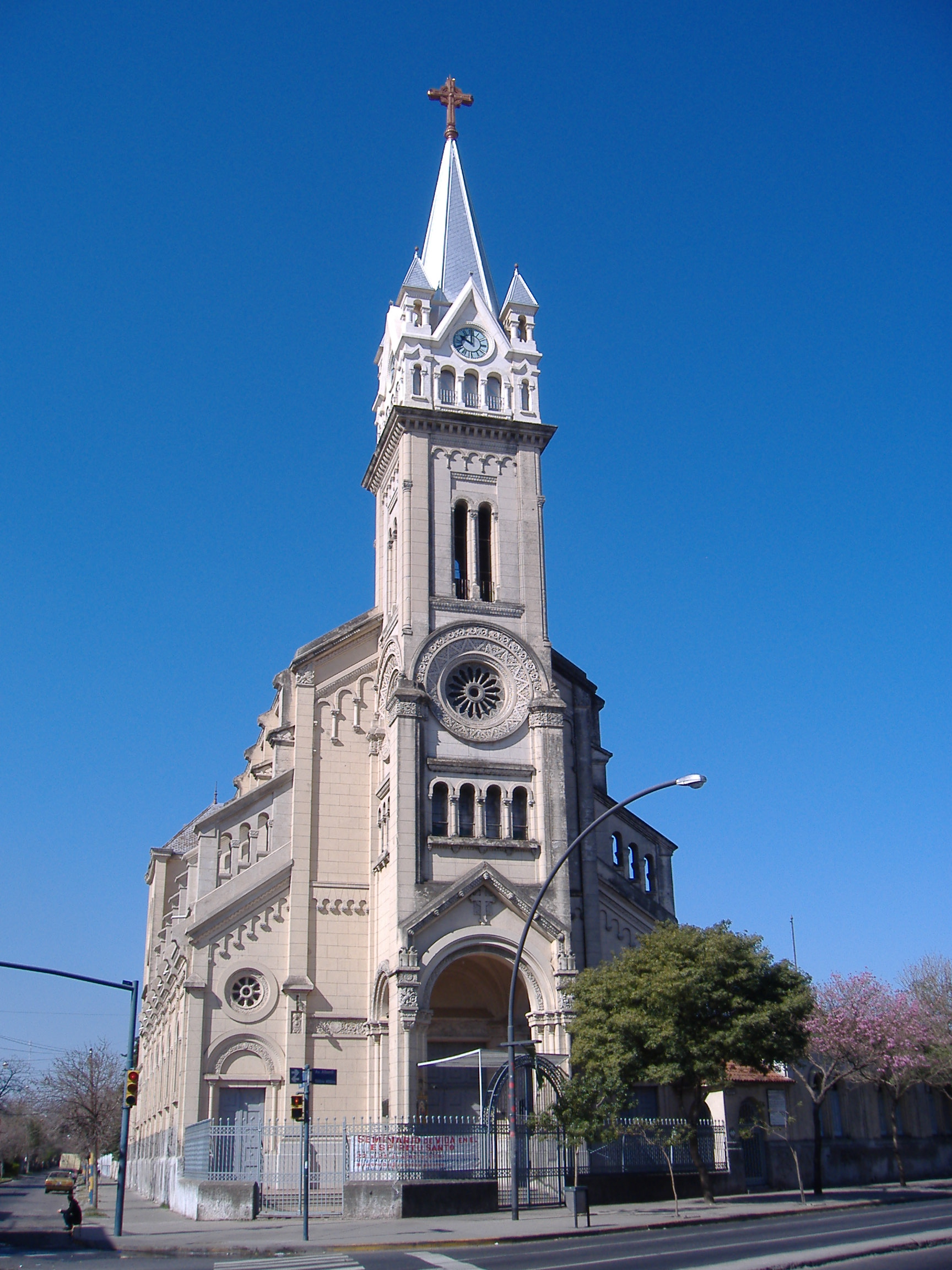
Parroquia del Perpetuo Socorro, a church in the Lisandro de la Torre neighbourhood.

Through the years, Rosario has spread in all directions. Towards the south, beyond Pellegrini, there are two more boulevards, 27 de Febrero and Seguí, and avenues Uriburu, Arijón and Battle y Ordóñez.

To the west, after Oroño, there are the avenues Ovidio Lagos and Francia, Avellaneda Boulevard and Provincias Unidas Avenue. The main neighborhoods in the south are La Tablada, Parque Casado, Las Heras, Las Delicias and Las Flores. The city ends in the Saladillo Stream (the natural border with Villa Gobernador Gálvez).

Among the neighborhoods in the west are Echesortu, Belgrano, Triángulo, Moderno, Godoy and Fisherton (near the west end of the city, formerly home of hierarchical personnel of English railroad companies established in Rosario).

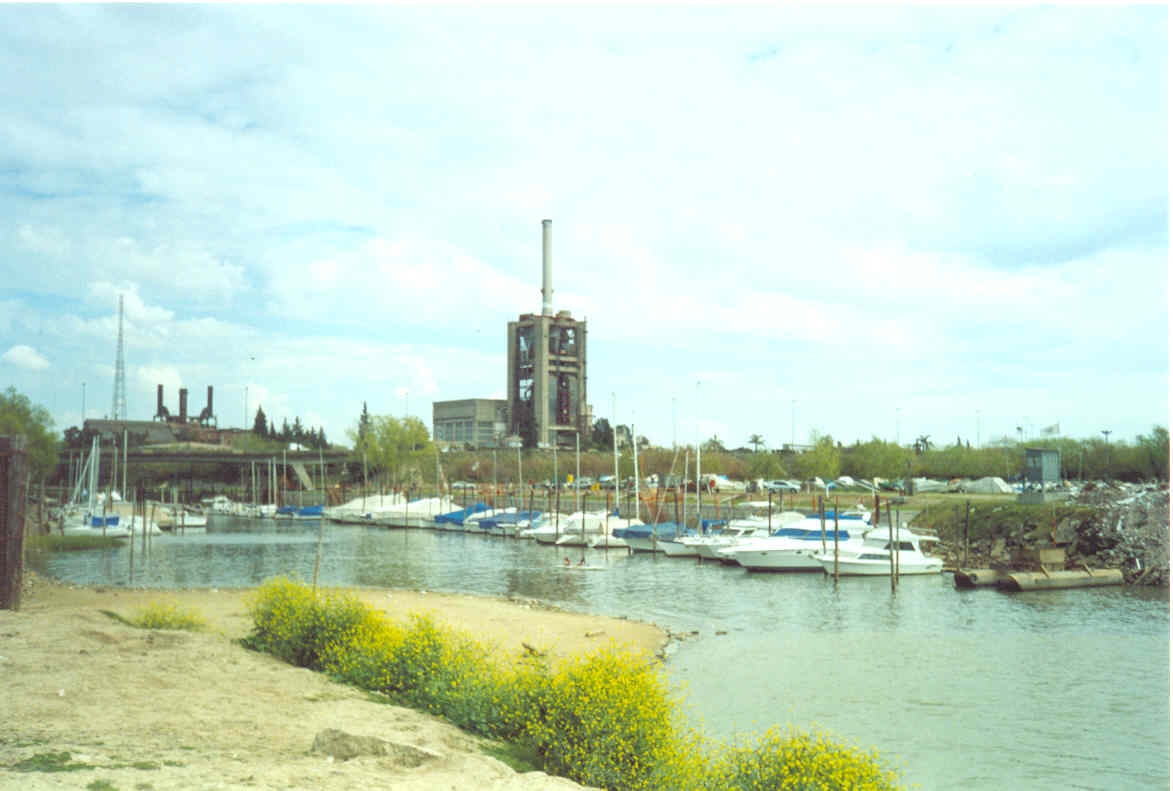
The Ludueña Stream and the Sorrento power plant, near the end of the stream into the Paraná River.

To the north-east there lie the neighborhoods of Pichincha (a red-light district in early 20th century, now home to an open-air antiquities fair: Mercado de antigüedades "Feria Retro La Huella"), Ludueña, Lisandro de la Torre (home of the Rosario Central football club) and Empalme Graneros; these last three are in the influence area of the Ludueña Stream, now contained by underground piping, but until the 1980s a source of floods.

Next to the Rosario Central stadium there is a large park, Parque Alem, and not far from it there stands the Sorrento thermoelectric power plant. North from the Lisandro de la Torre neighborhood there are Alberdi (formerly an independent town), La Florida (with a popular beach resort of the same name) and Rucci.

The main streets in the north are Alberdi Avenue and its continuation, Rondeau Boulevard (which leads to the north exit of the city, the access to the Rosario-Victoria Bridge and the town of Granadero Baigorria). These major arteries are crossed by several avenues: Las Tres Vías, Génova, Sorrento and Puccio.

=== The coast ===
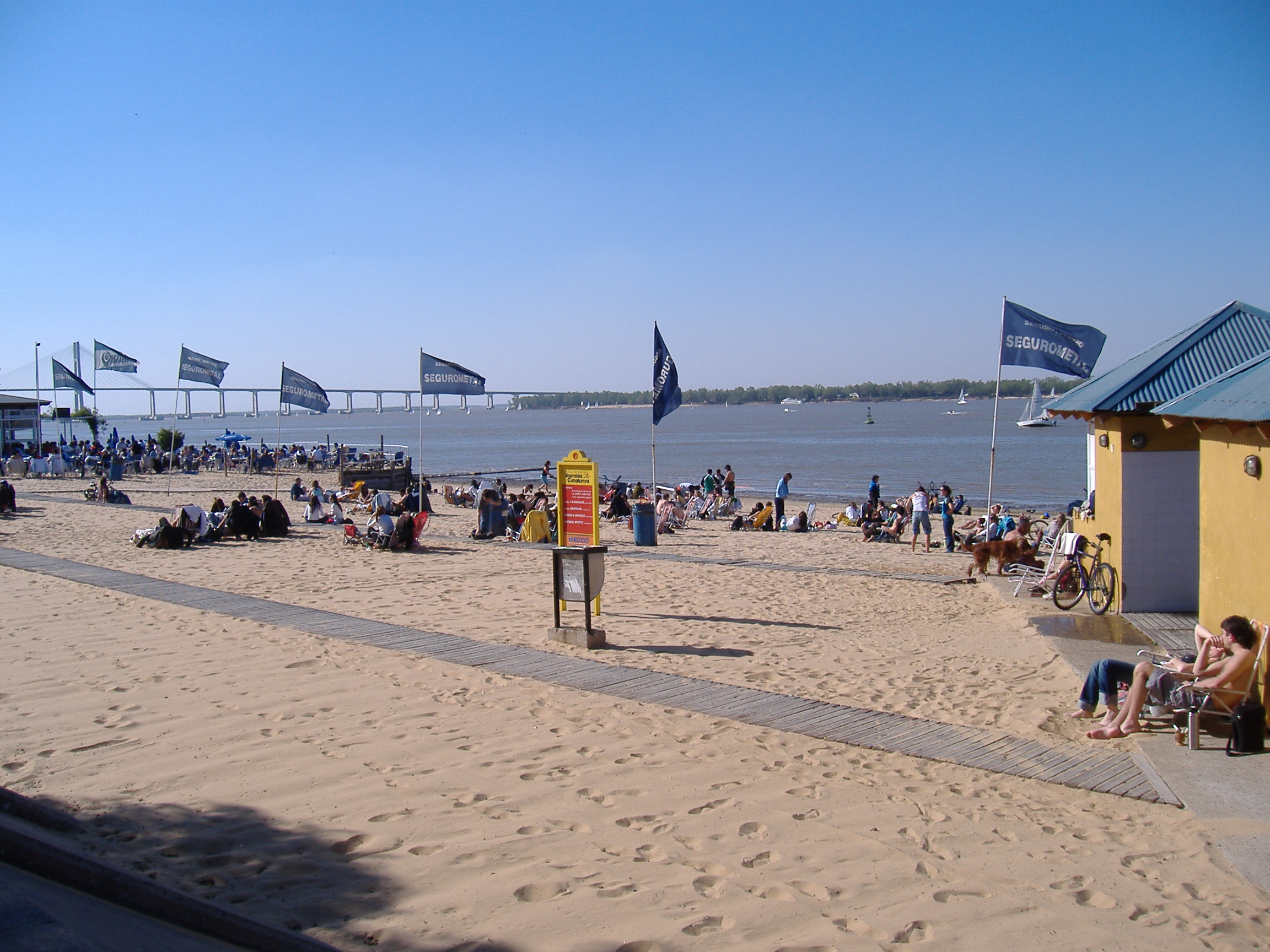
A beach on the Paraná River, northeastern Rosario.

An important part of Rosario's urban character is its coastline. The city recovered the shore of the Paraná not long ago, thanks to a reorganization of terrains owned by the port and the national railroad system that took up the space. Going from the center immediately north of the port, the coastline is occupied by parks: Parque Nacional a la Bandera, Parque de España, Parque de las Colectividades and Parque Sunchales.

The Parque de España was funded by Spain's government and was inaugurated in 1993 in the presence of the king and queen of Spain. The park connects the low shore with the ravine by stairs, under which a culture center is built. The culture center was the seat of some events of the Third International Congress of the Spanish Language (which took place wholly in Rosario, from 17 to 20 November 2004).

=== Origin of names ===
- Pellegrini Avenue, Avellaneda Boulevard and Plaza Sarmiento are named after presidents, Carlos Pellegrini, Nicolás Avellaneda and Domingo Faustino Sarmiento. Two downtown streets are named after the rival caudillos Justo José de Urquiza and Juan Manuel de Rosas.
- San Martín St. and Plaza San Martín are of course named after the Liberator, General José de San Martín.
- The coastal Belgrano Avenue, which runs before the Flag Memorial, is named after Manuel Belgrano, creator of the Argentine flag.
- The Lisandro de la Torre neighborhood, named after a distinguished politician from Rosario, is more commonly known as Arroyito, "Little Creek" (a reference to the Ludueña Stream). The Alem Park, also located in this area, is named after Leandro Alem, founder of the Radical Civic Union.
- Córdoba Avenue becomes Eva Perón Avenue outside of the town center, and former Godoy Avenue was renamed Presidente Perón Avenue.
- Many streets in the town center are named after provinces: Buenos Aires, Santa Fe, Córdoba, Rioja, San Luis, San Juan, Mendoza, Corrientes, Entre Ríos.
- A few streets are named with dates: 3 de Febrero (3 February, day of the Battle of San Lorenzo), 9 de Julio (9 July, Independence Day), 27 de Febrero (27 February, date of creation of the national flag), Primero de Mayo (1 May, Labor Day).
- There are streets with names of countries: Italia (Italy), España (Spain), Paraguay; and of cities: Buenos Aires, Montevideo.

== See also ==
- Geography of Argentina
- Districts of Rosario

== Sources ==
- Municipalidad de Rosario (Municipality of Rosario website, geographic information, in Spanish).
- Article on Rosario in the Spanish Wikipedia.
