= Olinto Gallo Workshops =

Metal casting and engraving company

Olinto Gallo Workshops was a metal casting and engraving company located in Rosario, province of Santa Fe, Argentina. It was founded by metalsmith Marcos Vanzo in 1888.

Olinto Gallo, who would later rename the company, started working as an apprentice around 1910–1912 at the peak of the development of the art of medal engraving in Argentina marked by the centennial of the May Revolution. Gallo was the second of three children from an Italian family.

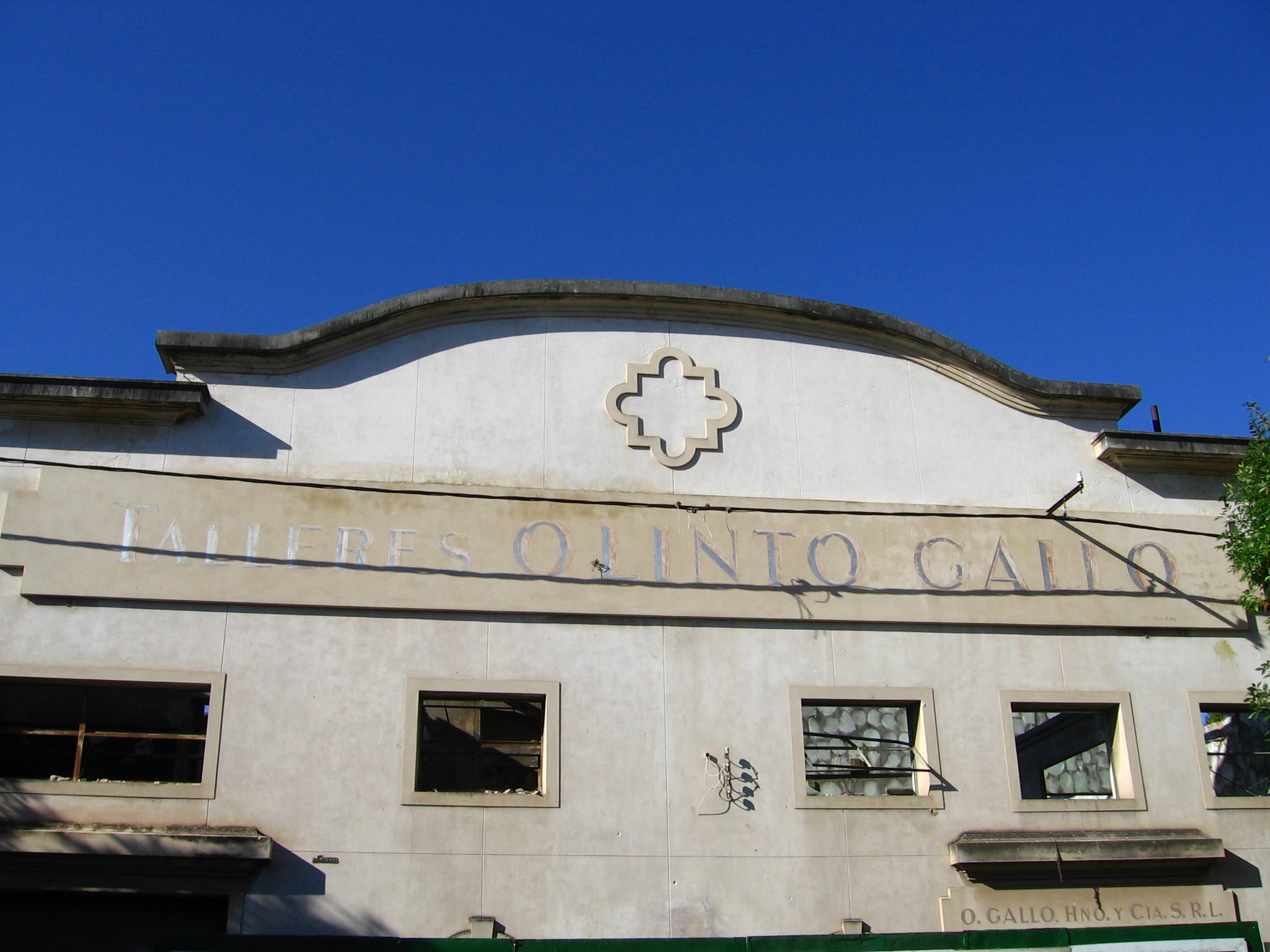
The facade of the workshops before demolition.

In March 1920, Vanzo sold the company to his son Silvio and to Gallo, who renamed it Rosario's Engraving and Chiseling Workshop. It was based in the core of Rosario's downtown, at 936 Córdoba St. The owners eventually decided to separate the commercial site from the workshop: the offices were moved to 1328 Santa Fe St., still in the city center, while the workshop was relocated to 1055 Olivé St., in the Arroyito neighborhood.

Gallo put his name on the company in 1934. "Olinto Gallo Workshops" became well known in its field, counting prestigious houses from Buenos Aires among its clients.

The workshops were eventually shut down and demolished in 2006. Before that, a group of volunteers rescued a number of works, to be exhibited at the Municipal Museum of the City. Some of those works are still on display at "Ferraro, Maquinarias y Rezagos Industriales", Pte. Roca St. 3546, Rosario.

== Sources ==
- Carolina Stofblat; A. Vanesa Dell' Aquila (September 2001). Publication of the Regional Seminar, career of History, Faculty of Humanities and Arts of the National University of Rosario (UNR).
- A. Vanesa Dell' Aquila (September 2001). Licenciatura (BS) thesis, History career, Faculty of Humanities and Arts, UNR.
