= Minetti =

Minetti may refer to:

== People ==
- Annalisa Minetti, Italian singer
- Bernhard Minetti, German actor
- Hans-Peter Minetti (1926 – 2006), German actor
- Massimo Minetti, Italian footballer
- Nicole Minetti, Italian showgirl associated with Silvio Berlusconi

== Other uses ==
- Palacio Minetti, a building in Argentina
- Minetti Sports Cars, a company in Australia

== See also ==
- Minetto (disambiguation)
