= Ovidio Lagos Avenue =

Street in Rosario, Argentina

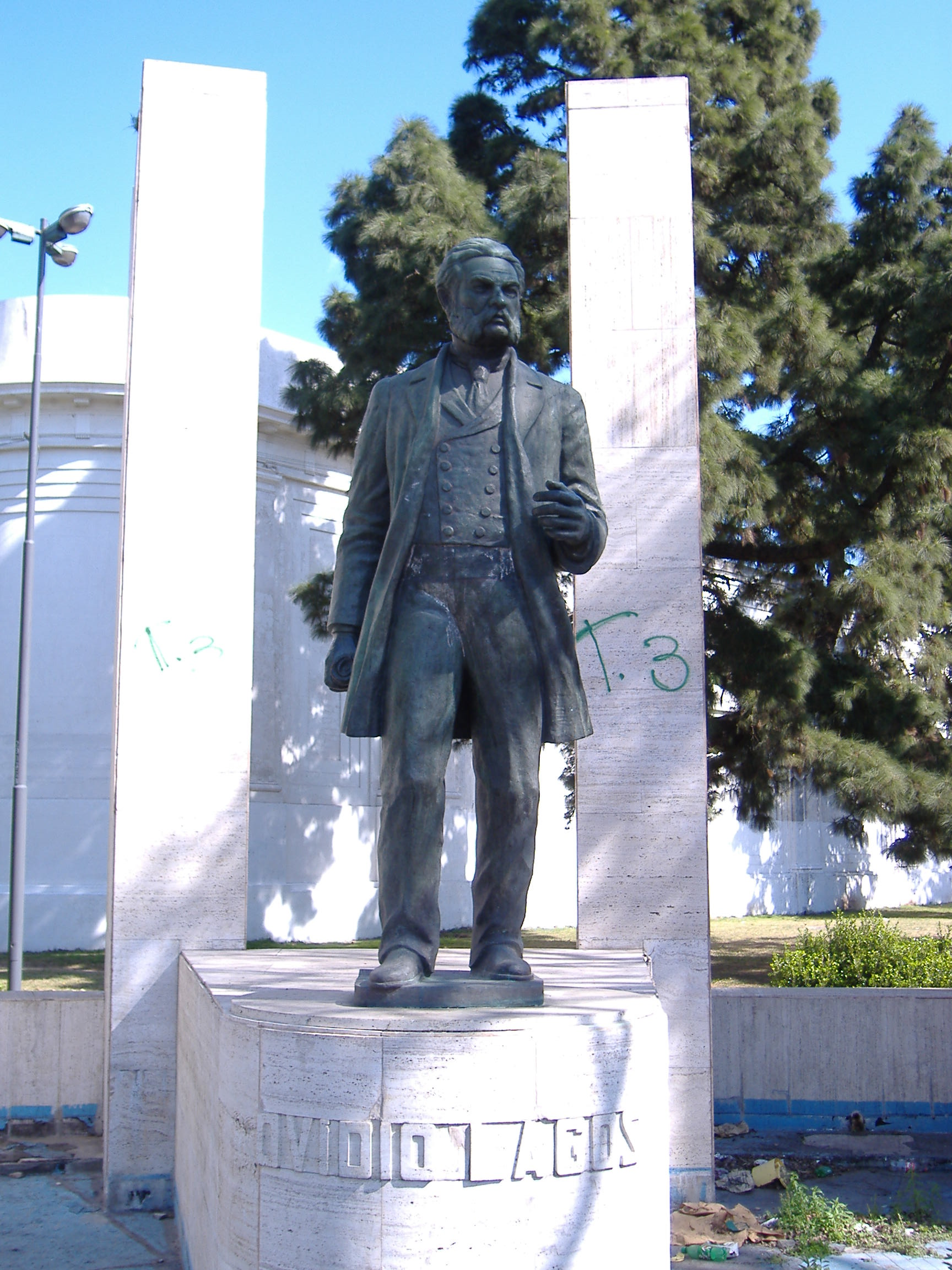
Monument to Ovidio Lagos on the corner of Ovidio Lagos Ave. and Pellegrini Ave.

Ovidio Lagos Avenue (in Spanish, Avenida Ovidio Lagos) is a street in Rosario, Santa Fe Province, Argentina. It is a one-way avenue that runs north–south through the center of the city, from the coastal Avenida del Valle by the Paraná River to the southern limit of the urbanized area.

Ovidio Lagos is the main street in Barrio Pichincha, a former red-light district. To the south, it forms one of the limits of Rosario's largest urban park, Parque de la Independencia. It exits Rosario turning into Provincial Route 18 (before National Route 178).

The avenue was formerly named La Plata. It was renamed in 1916 to in honour of politician and journalist Ovidio Lagos (1825–1891), founder and director of La Capital (the oldest still-published newspaper in Argentina).
