= Luis Lamas =

Argentine mayor of Rosario

Luis Lincoln Lamas Freyre (Note: In this name that follows Hispanic American naming customs, the first or paternal surname is Lamas and the second or maternal family name is Freyre.) (1865–1932) was the mayor of the Argentine city of Rosario, province of Santa Fe, from 21 February 1898 to 19 February 1904.

He was grandson of Uruguayan politician and patriot Luis María Lamas.

During the Lamas administration the city grew considerably in population (by more than one third between the 1900 and 1906 censuses) and gained infrastructure and luxury. New streets were opened and older ones were paved. In 1900 Lamas authorized the construction of the Parque de la Independencia, a large urban park designed by famed landscape architect Carlos Thays, which was inaugurated two years later.

Also in 1902, the foundation stone of the modern port of Rosario was laid, as works were initiated to clean up the ravine of the Paraná River and to build a new coastal avenue. Lamas also dictated the beginning of the works for the Central Market, and created the first commission that proposed to build a National Flag Memorial.

In 1900, the municipal administration dictated regulations that allowed for legal prostitution, mandating the inscription of sex workers in a recording office, with the requirements of being 18 or older, working only in authorized facilities, having two medical examinations per week, and keeping an updated sanitary card with a picture, as well as forbidding public exhibition. In 1902 a new regulation included the waitresses in certain types of bars, to avoid clandestine unrecorded prostitution.
