= Minetto =

Minetto may refer to:

- Minetto, New York, town
- Minetto (CDP), New York, hamlet and census-designated place
- Craig Minetto (born 1954, American former professional baseball pitcher
- Ernesto Minetto (1935 – 1991), Italian racing cyclist

== See also ==
- Minetti (disambiguation)
