= Plaza Pringles (Rosario) =

Square in the city of Rosario, Argentina

Coordinates: 32.945121°S 60.644386°W

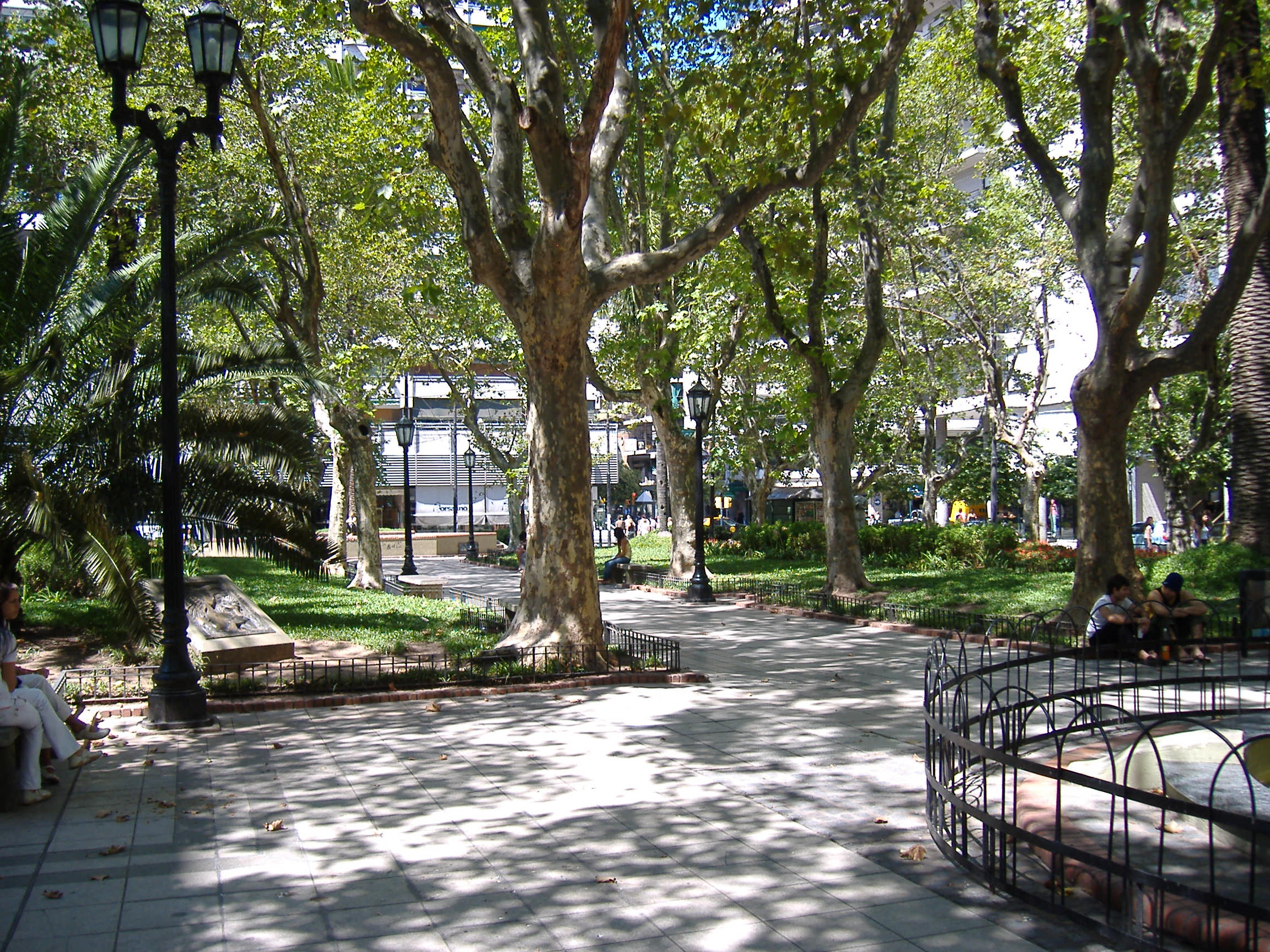
Plaza Pringles (facing east-southeast)

Plaza Pringles (Spanish for "Pringles Square") is a plaza (urban square) in Rosario, province of Santa Fe, Argentina. Its name is an homage to Colonel Juan Pascual Pringles, hero of the Spanish American wars of independence (who also gave its name to the Plaza Pringles located in the city of San Luis).

Plaza Pringles occupies a half block in the downtown area of Rosario, beside the historical section of Córdoba St. known as Paseo del Siglo. It is surrounded by the Juan Álvarez Passage, Paraguay St., Córdoba St., and Presidente Roca St. Opposite the Passage lies the old entrance to the Biblioteca Argentina Dr. Juan Álvarez (the largest public library in Rosario).

The terrain where the plaza was to be located was originally bought by Rosario's Political Chief (mayor) Nicasio Oroño, and turned into a public space in 1898. It received several names until acquiring that of Pringles.

== Recent history and events ==
- Since 1981, the plaza's narrow paths were often occupied by a flea market, with artisans selling merchandise on the floor. A municipal order forced them to move to a more spacious location in 2003.
- On 25 March 2005 the plaza hosted the first live reenactment of a Via Crucis in the city.
- On 2 December 2006 the plaza was the stage for the first flash mob in Rosario (the second in Argentina), consisting in a pillow fight.
- Plaza Pringles has often been the center of many social or political demonstrations, such as a protest of tango dancers against the closing of milongas (tango bars), the collection of citizens' signatures demanding the repeal of the Ley de Lemas, and a show following the first gay pride parade celebrated in the city and demanding a law of civil unions for same-sex couples.
