= Municipal Museum of the City (Rosario) =

Coordinates: 32°57′44″S 60°39′25″W

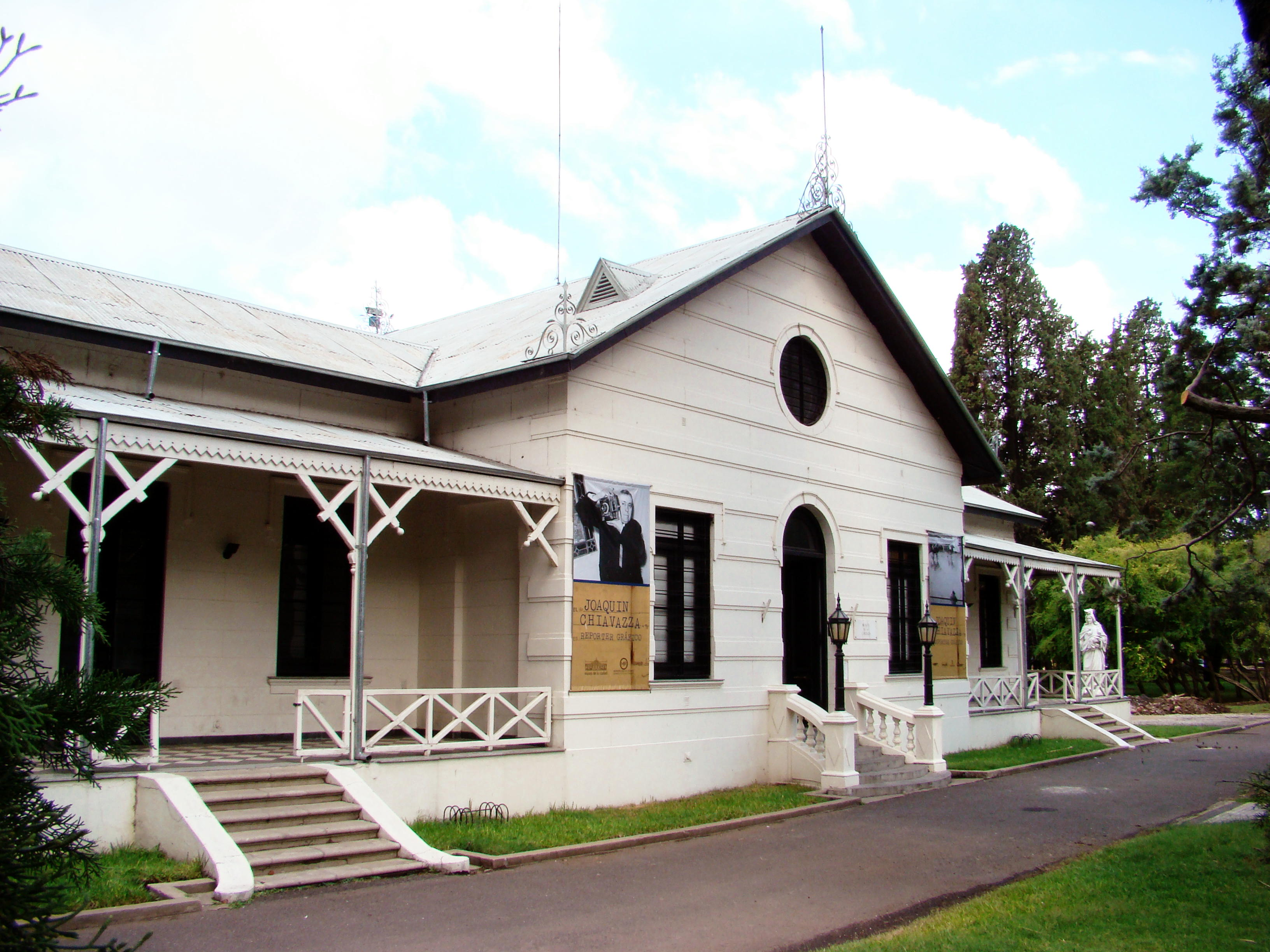
Museum of the City

The Museum of the City (in Spanish, Museo de la Ciudad) is a museum in Rosario, Argentina. It is located at 2300 Oroño Boulevard on a corner of the Parque de la Independencia, and is administered by the municipal government of Rosario. It was created on 24 August 1981 during the administration of mayor Alberto Natale.

The museum was originally located at 1540 Oroño Bvld. in a property intended to be the mayor's residence. In the 1990s, the museum was moved to a new location: a building constructed in 1902 to house the park's administration and the Gardener's Apprentice School. The building was restored and adapted for its new function before officially re-opening on 27 August 1993.

The museum's collection is composed of more than 7,000 objects, mostly everyday items as well as photographs and printed documents, books and periodicals; from the late 19th century to present.

== Historical exhibitions ==
- Julio Vanzo and his city
- Presidential visits to Rosario
- Joaquín Chiavazza, witness of the city
- Attended by their owners
- Emilia Bertolé
- Discover and value. Transformations of the urban landscape
- Plague. Epidemic in Rosario
- City without borders
- Pharmacy Denmark

== Schedules ==
- From the Library and Archive: from Tuesday to Friday from 9 to 14.
- Guided school visits: Tuesday through Friday from 9 to 15, during the school year. We request shifts to Cons. of Ernesto Aguirre Museum.
