= Plaza Montenegro (Rosario) =

Coordinates: 32.949479°S 60.637777°W

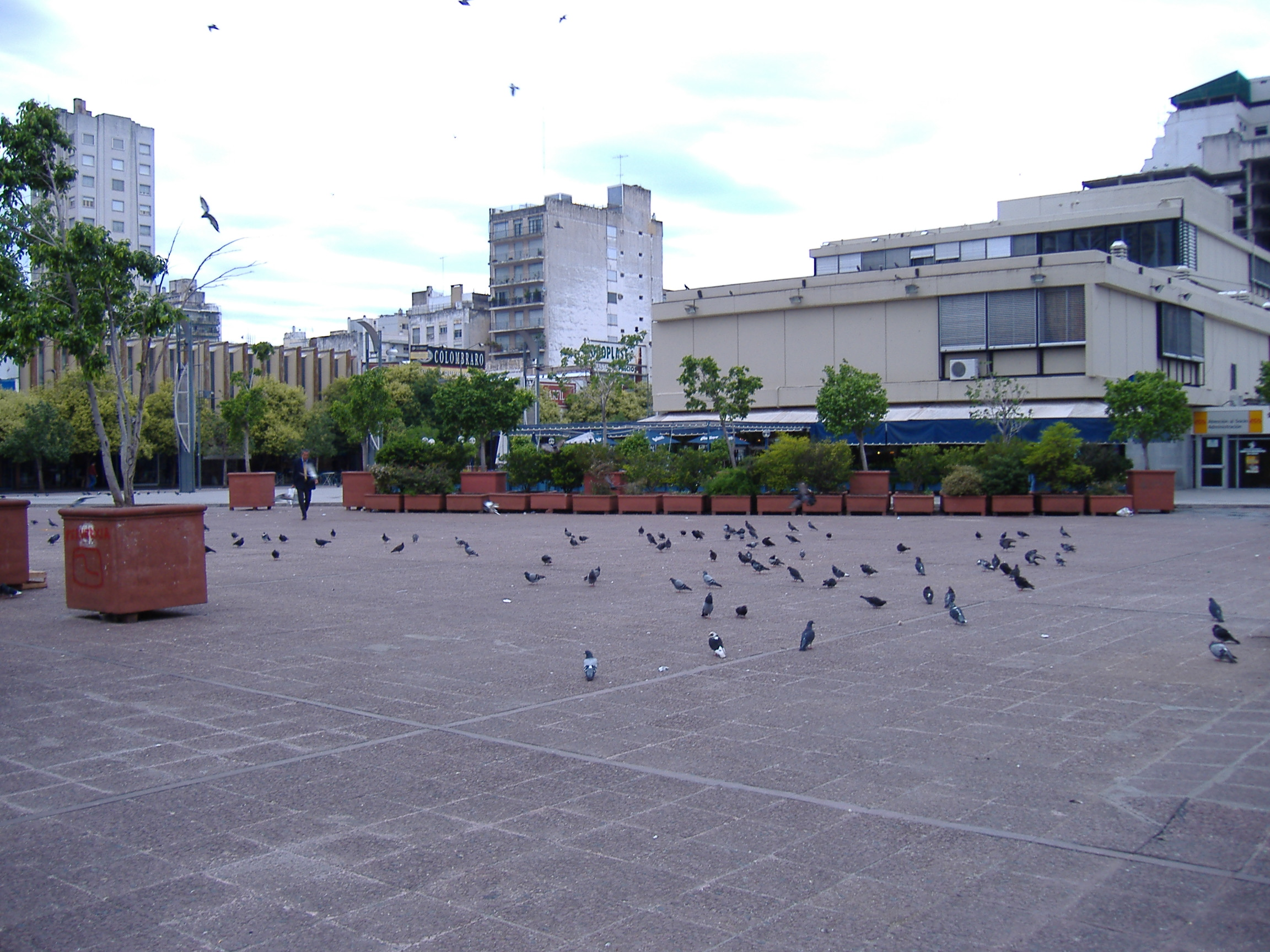
The center of Plaza Montenegro

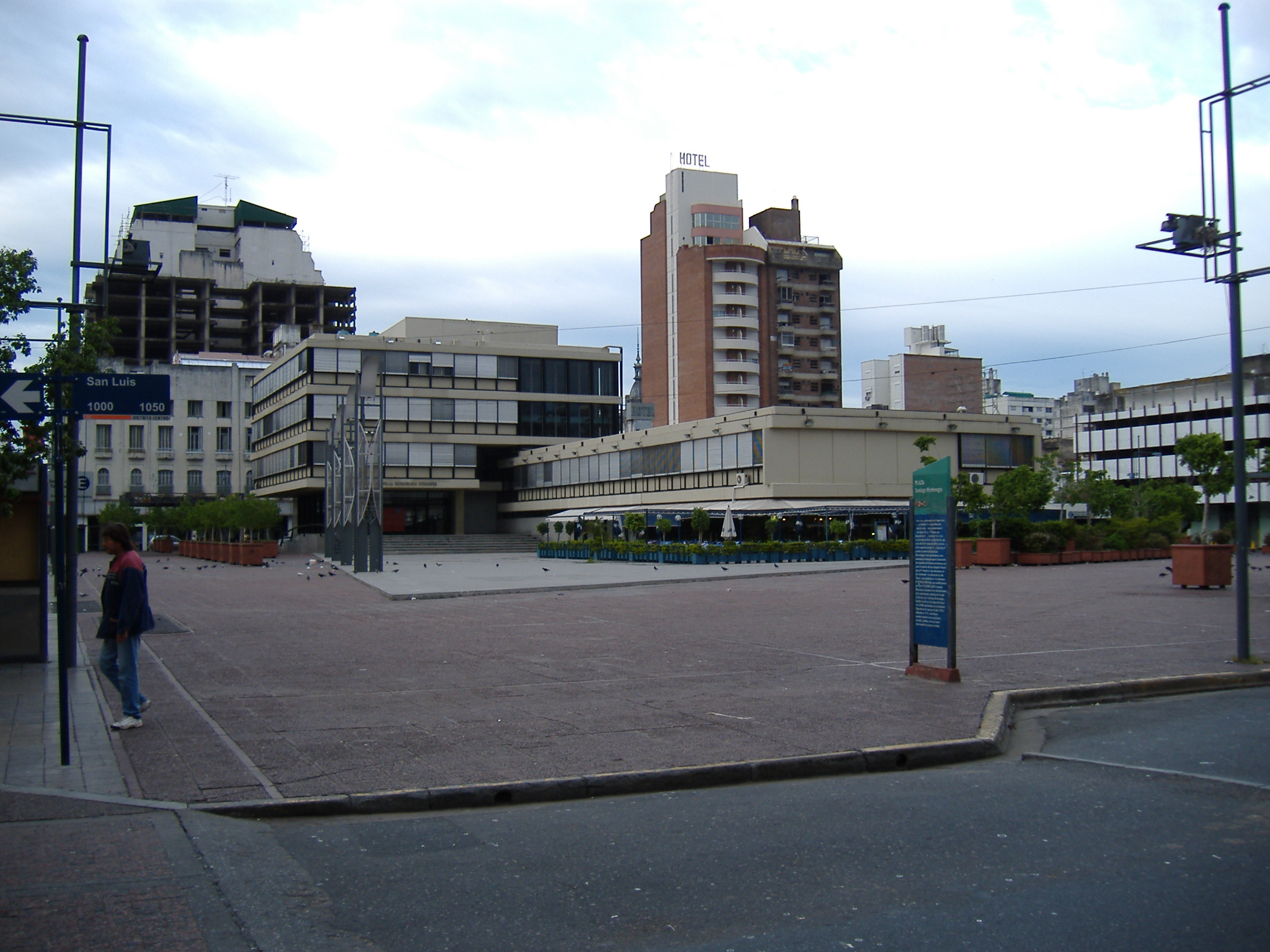
Looking towards the Bernardino Rivadavia Culture Center

Plaza Santiago Montenegro is a small hardscape plaza in the city of Rosario, province of Santa Fe, Argentina. Its name honors one of the first Spanish-descended settlers in the area, Captain Santiago Montenegro. It was known as Plaza Pinasco until 1993.

The plaza occupies part of a block in the downtown area, limited by San Luis St., a pedestrian segment of San Martín St., and a smaller street or passage called Barón de Mauá. Most of the block is taken up by the Bernardino Rivadavia Culture Center.

== History ==
The site of the plaza was a marketplace between 1857 and 1903. A better organized fruit and vegetable market replaced it around 1905, which lasted there until 1962, when mayor Cándido Carballo ordered its removal for sanitary reasons, in 1962. The buildings were demolished, leaving an empty lot. The Automóvil Club Argentino struck an agreement with the Municipality to build a car park underground, while the ground area was turned into a hardscape public space called Plaza Emidgio Pinasco.

When Argentina hosted the 1978 FIFA World Cup, Rosario was chosen as a sub-seat, and the state organization in charge of FIFA's requirements appropriated a sector of the plaza to build a press center. The building was first planned as a provisional one, but then the organization decided to make it permanent, and donate it to the Municipality to function as a culture center.

The plaza was rebuilt in 1993, during the administration of mayor Héctor Cavallero. Since then, it was often occupied by a sort of flea market, with artisans selling small merchandise and makeshift kiosks offering used textbooks. In 2005, reacting to complaints about the state of the plaza, and following a consistent policy of ordering the physical distribution of street fairs in the city, the municipal government surveyed the sellers and selected a number of them to work with permits in the plaza.
