= Parque de la Independencia =

Park in Argentina

Coordinates: 32°57′31.82″S 60°39′35.62″W

Independence Park
- Parque de la Independencia
- Aerial view
- Interactive map of Independence Park
- Location: Rosario, Argentina
- Opened: January 1, 1902; 124 years ago
- Designer: Carlos Thays
- Owner: Municipality of Rosario

The Parque de la Independencia ("Independence Park") is a large public park in Rosario, province of Santa Fe, Argentina. It is located near the geographical center of the city, its limits defined by Moreno Street and three important avenues: Pellegrini Avenue, Ovidio Lagos Avenue, and 27 de Febrero Boulevard. It has a surface area of 1.26 km^{2} (0.49 sq mi).

The park is the city's largest and most traditional park. It was designed around 1900 by architect Carlos Thays to celebrate the centenary of May Revolution in 1910. Its most popular area is the "Laguito" (Little Lake) plaza, where visitors can go pedal-boating on the water during the day and enjoy the "Dancing Waters" show at night (currently under repair). Just a short walk away lies the Children's Garden (*Jardín de los Niños*), a feature that makes this area a favorite among the youngest visitors. The park was opened in January 1902.

== History ==
(Left): the park during its construction; (right): People attending its inauguration

By the late 19th century, Rosario was a city in constant growth, looking toward the dream of becoming one of the world’s major metropolises. With New York and Paris serving as models, the city's leaders –including the mayor at the time, Luis Lamas– recognized that this urban center still lacked a "green lung". Rosario had a population of 112,000 inhabitants in 1900. In the society of the time, the upper class would spend their afternoons taking carriage rides along Córdoba Street, continuing onto Boulevard Santafesino (now Oroño) until reaching Boulevard Argentino (now Pellegrini).

The Parque de la Independencia was the first park in the city. Its origin lies in four public squares at the intersection of two then newly opened large boulevards, Santafesino and Argentino (today Oroño Boulevard and Pellegrini Avenue). The four-part plaza was named Independencia.

In 1900 the provincial government authorized the municipality, presided by Lamas, to expropriate the lands to create a new park. The plans for the park were drawn by landscape architect Carlos Thays (famous for his work in the Buenos Aires Botanical Garden, among many others). In 1901 the municipality built the internal avenues and roads, an artificial lake and, with the earth removed for the lake, a small artificial hill (even today known as La Montañita, the Little Mountain). That year, also, the First Festival of the Tree took place, and 6,000 trees were planted by students in the park, which was inaugurated on 1 January 1902.

== Attractions ==
There is an area reserved for fairs, initially intended for agricultural expositions, then also industry and commerce. At the Calendar every evening since 1946 gardeners re-arrange the flowers to show the date written on the ground.

The park includes a number of gardens, they are:

French Garden

Calendar

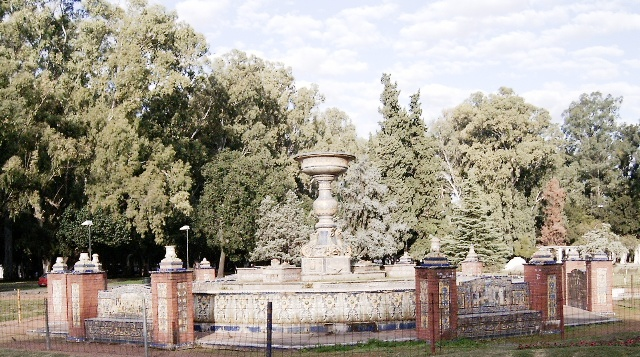
Spanish fountain

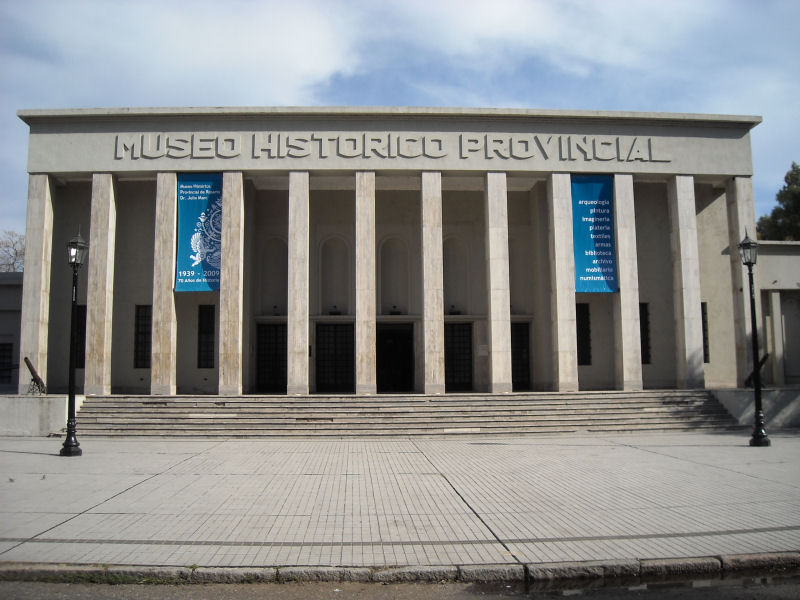
Julio Marc Museum

Estadio Marcelo Bielsa

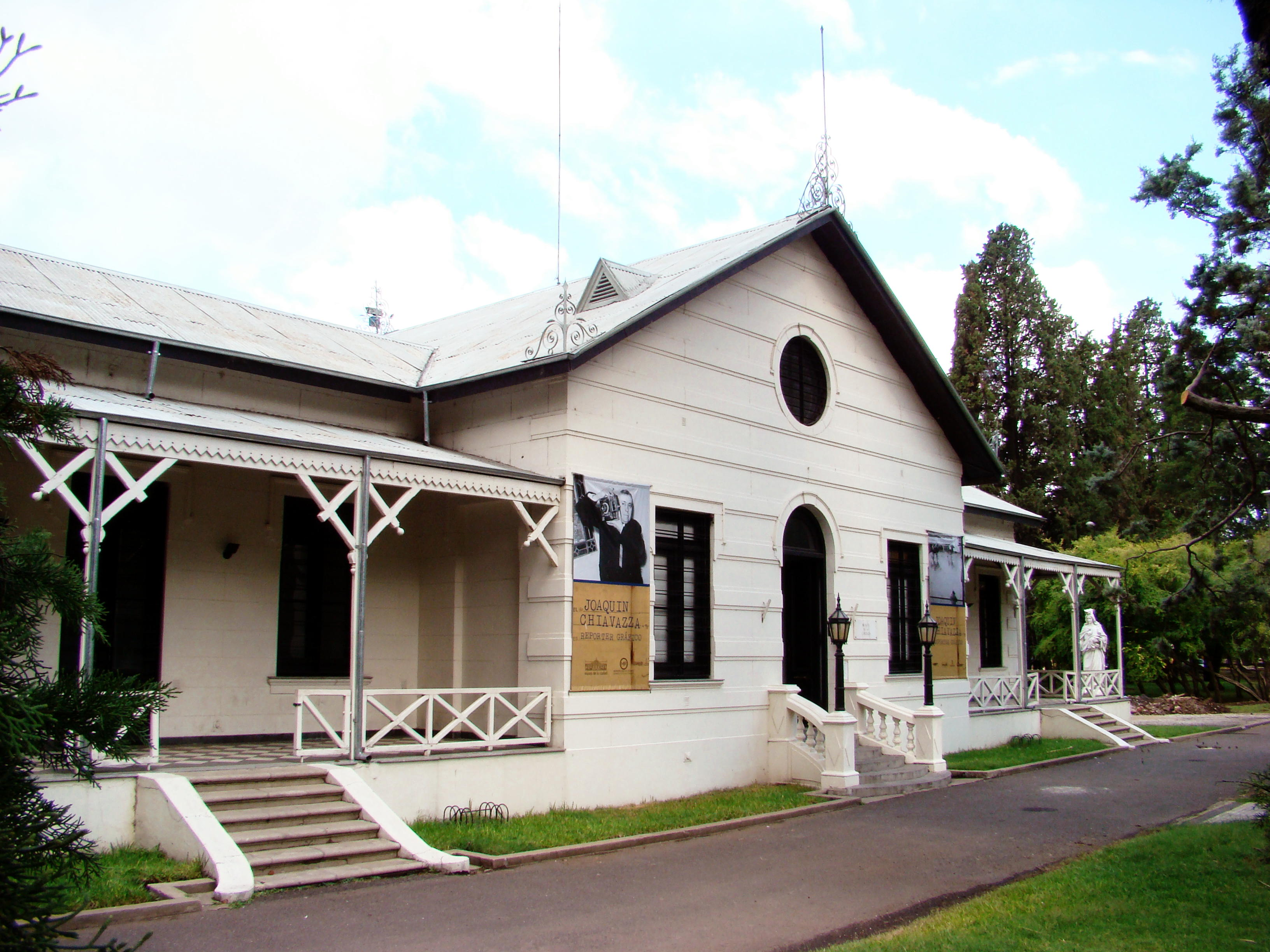
Museum of the City

- Rosedal (Rose Garden), finished in 1915, with several species of roses, as well as sculptures and fountains
- French Garden, built in 1942, with many flower arrangements and a large marble fountain
- Children's Garden, an area of 35,000 m^{2} (380,000 sq ft) with amusement and educational facilities

The park includes a number of museums such as:

- Museum of the City, opened in 1902, initially the School of Gardener Apprentices
- Juan B. Castagnino Fine Arts Museum, opened in 1937
- Dr. Julio Marc Provincial Historical Museum, opened in 1939

=== Sports clubs ===
The park also hosts three sports clubs:

- Newell's Old Boys (one of the two main football clubs in the city along with Rosario Central)
- Gimnasia y Esgrima
- Provincial

=== Sports venues ===
- Estadio Marcelo Bielsa, home venue of Newell's Old Boys
- Jorge Newbery Municipal Stadium, started in 1925, the first state-funded multi-sports venue for public use in the country. It hosted several sporting events such as the 2022 South American Youth Games, and the 2005 South American Junior Championship (athletics)
- Patinódromo Municipal "Roberto Tagliabué" (Municipal Skating Rink), opened for the 1982 Southern Cross Games and host of the 2014 Inline speed skating World Championship, it also hosted the 2026 South American Games
- Hipódromo Independencia, a horse racing venue opened in 1901, was visited by turf enthusiasts Julio A. Rosa and singer Carlos Gardel. The Independencia Racetrack features three tracks used for training, exercising horses, and competitions. In August 2018, several sports venues were inaugurated within the property occupied by the hippodrome. Among the completed projects—which required an investment of nearly $70 million— synthetic-turf field hockey and rugby fields were built within the central oval, alongside a show-jumping and equestrian arena.
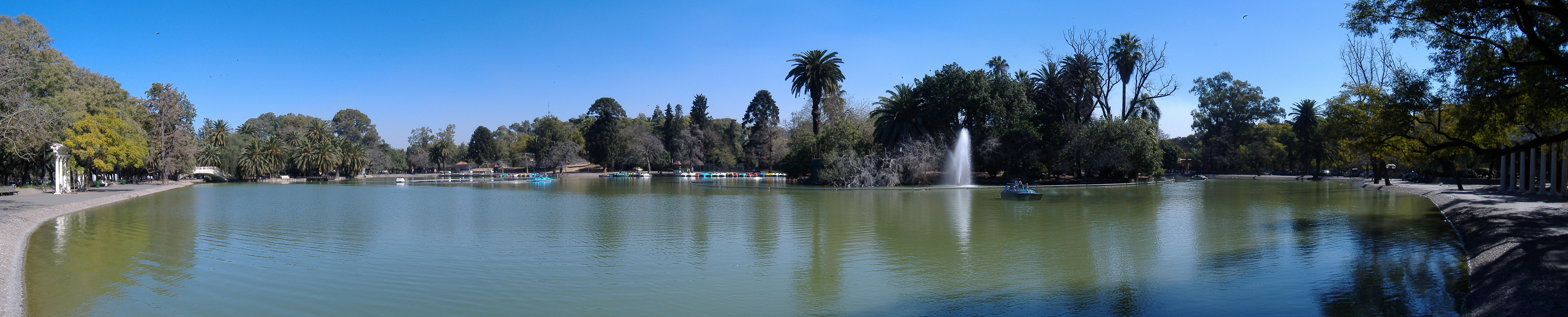
Panoramic view of the artificial lake

== Gallery ==
Dancing waters

Roman-style structure

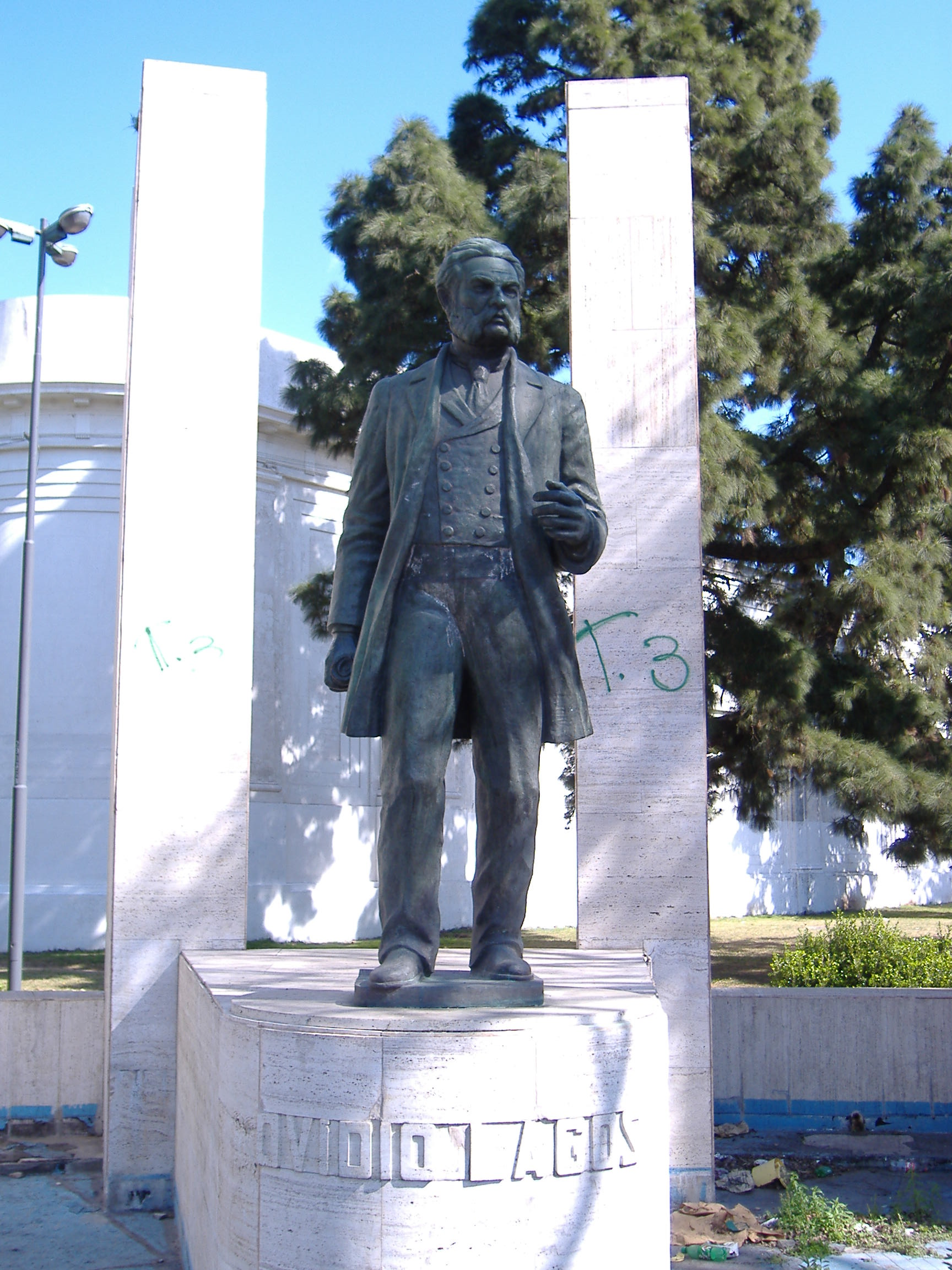
Monument to Ovidio Lagos

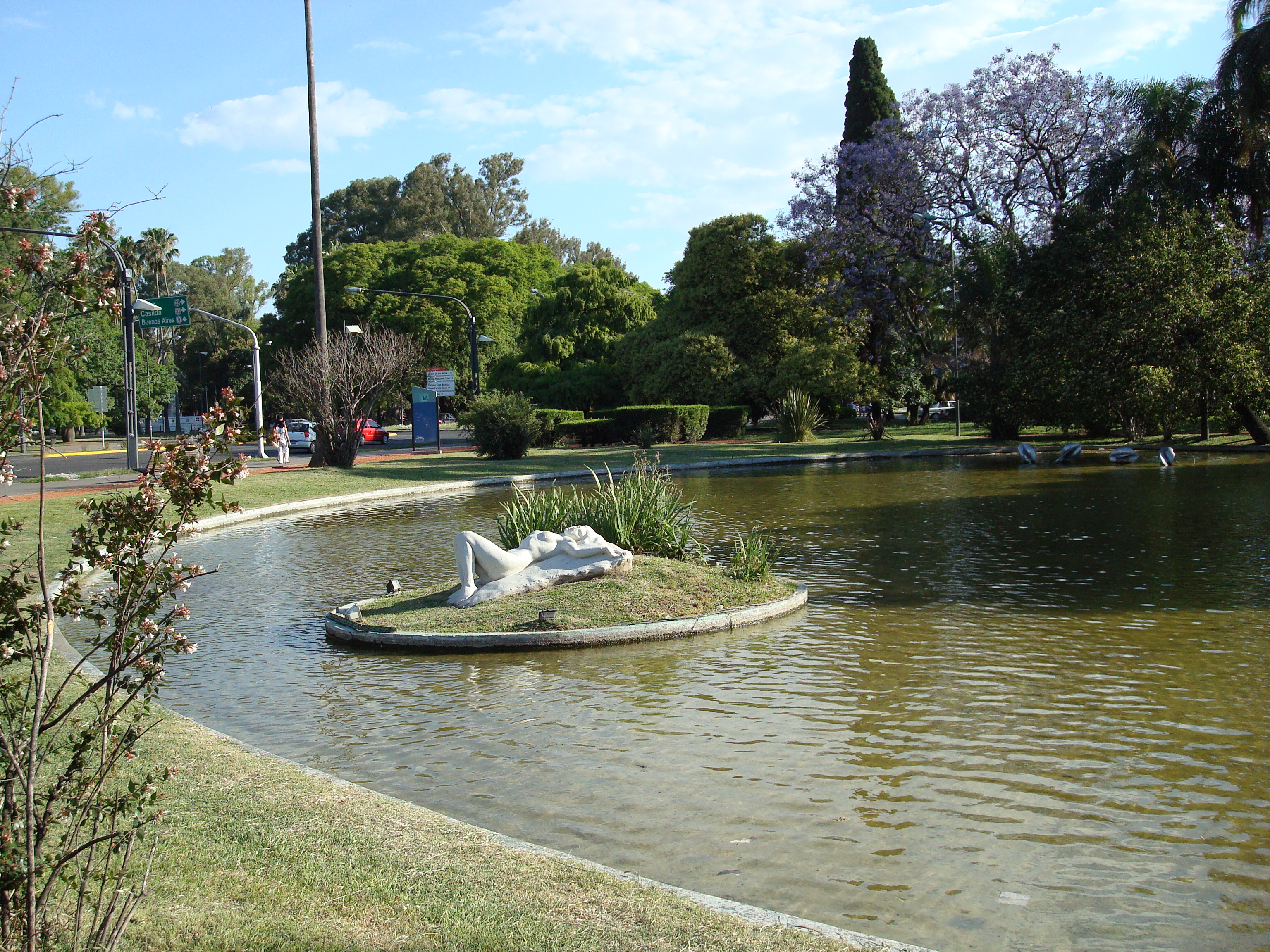
El laguito

Rose garden

Monument to Garibaldi
