= Paseo del Siglo =

Street in Rosario, Argentina

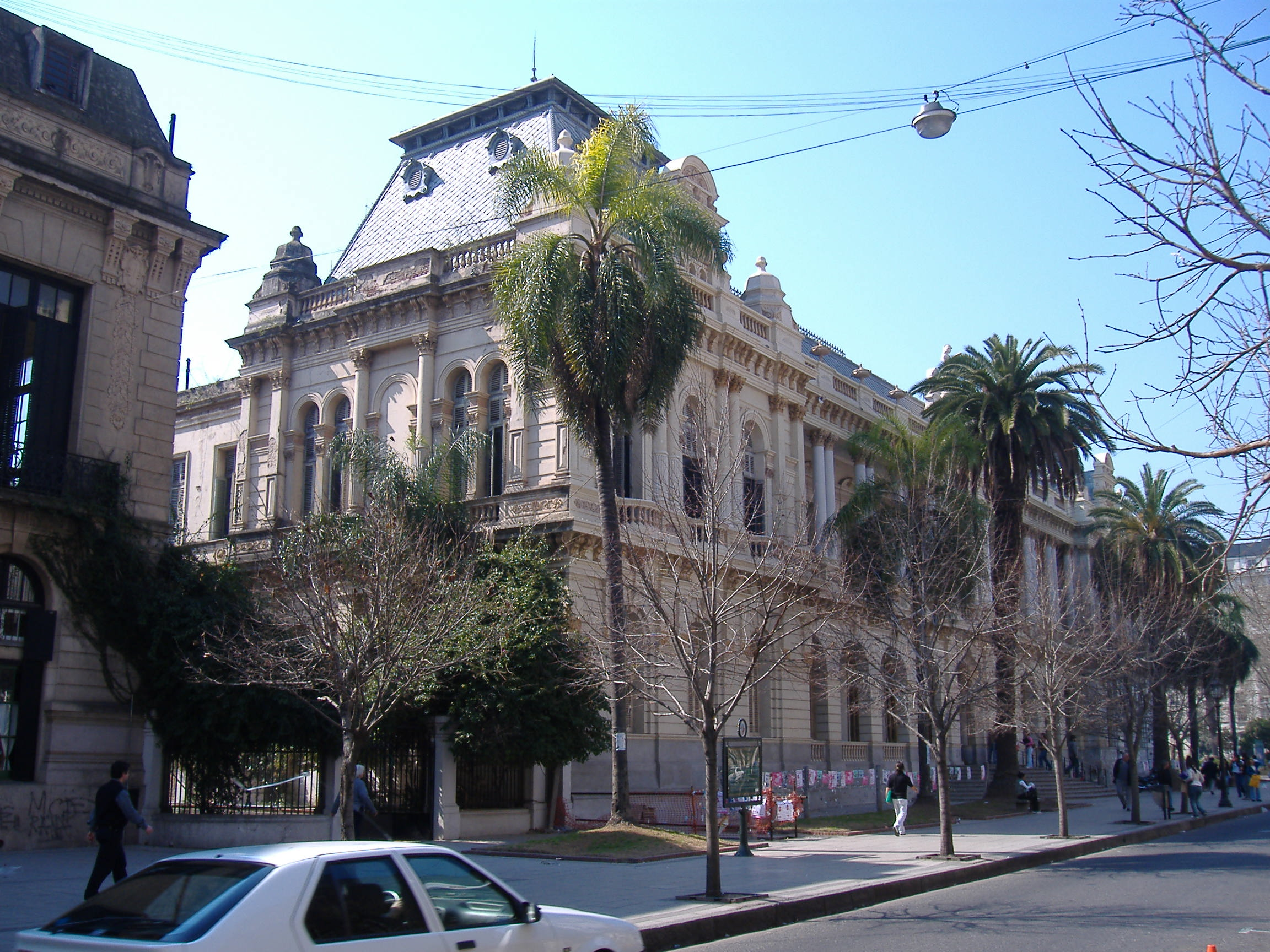
Faculty of Law.

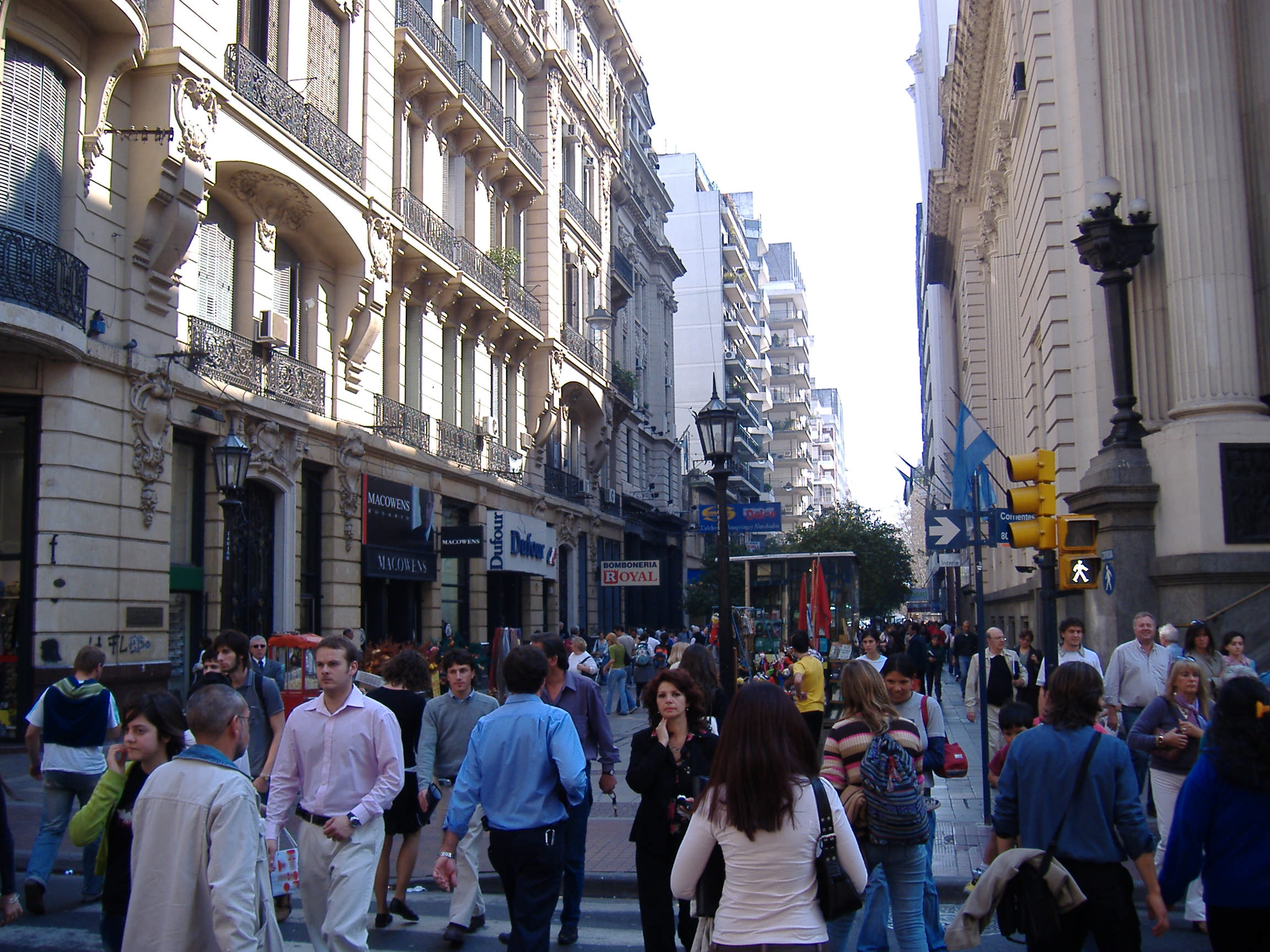
Córdoba St.

Paseo del Siglo (literally Tour of the Century or Walk of the Century) is a part of the historical center of the city of Rosario, Argentina. It comprises eight blocks in the downtown Córdoba Street, from Oroño Boulevard east up to Paraguay Street. This segment and the adjacent streets showcase a number of historical buildings, from public and private institutions to former mansions of wealthy families. These have been preserved or restored under the sponsorship of a municipal preservation program.

Important sites along and around the Paseo del Siglo include:

- The former Palace of Justice, now the Faculty of Law of the National University of Rosario;
- Normal School No. 2, now a National Historic Monument.
- The former Police Headquarters, which now houses the seat of the delegation of the provincial government, some municipal offices, and a memorial (Centro Popular de la Memoria) at the site of Dirty War illegal detention center;
- The Basilica Cathedral of Our Lady of the Rosary, the seat of the Archdiocese of Rosario;
- The Dr. Juan Álvarez Library;
- The seat of the Rosario Board of Trade and the Palacio Minetti, already within the pedestrian-only segment of Córdoba St., one block from the officially recognized end of the Paseo;
- Two important urban squares, Plaza San Martín and Plaza Pringles.
