= Palacio Minetti =

Coordinates: 32.945481°S 60.642917°W

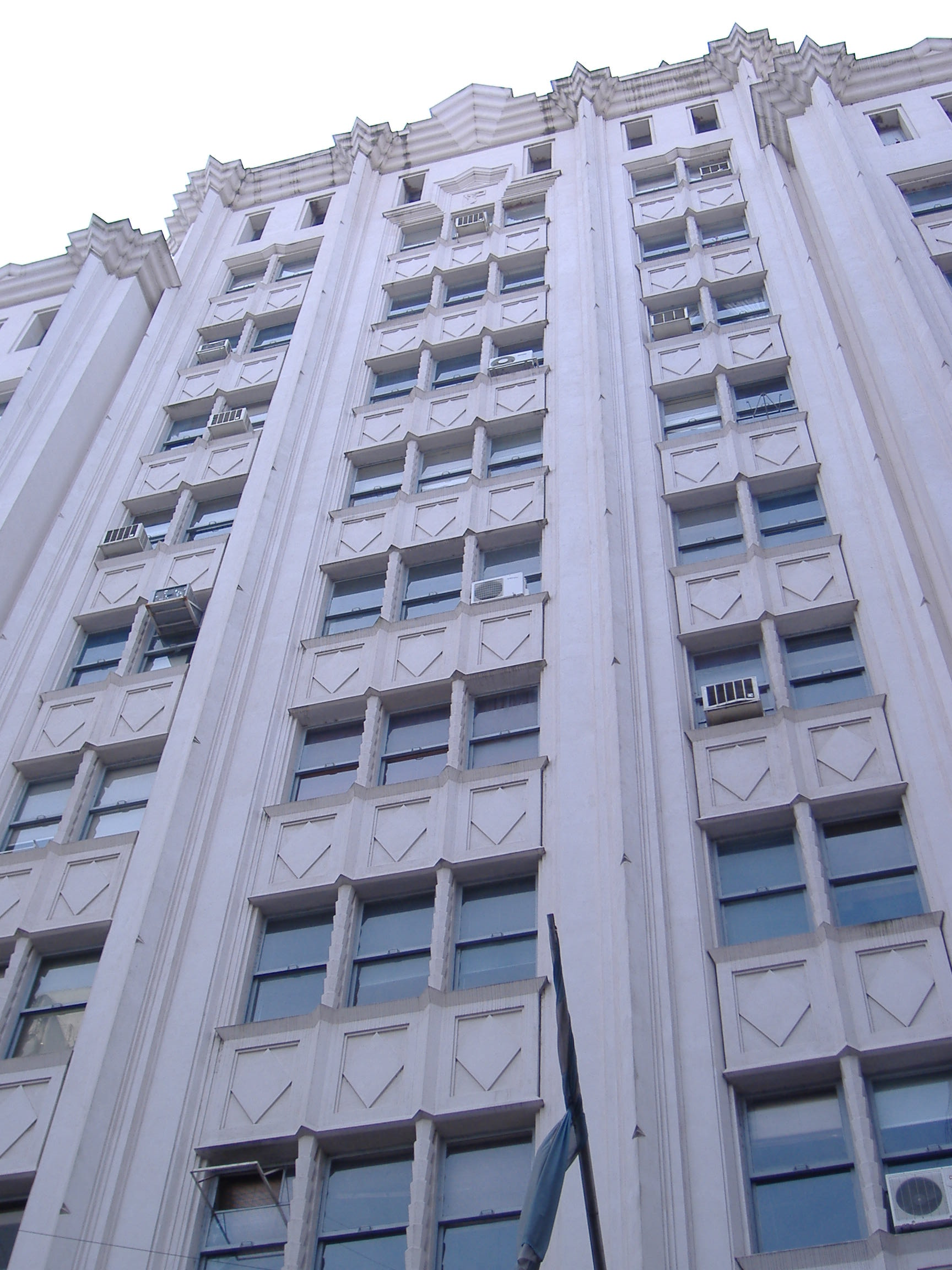
Façade of the Palacio Minetti

The Palacio Minetti (Spanish, Minetti Palace) is a building in Rosario, in Santa Fe Province, Argentina. It is located at one end of the pedestrian segment of Córdoba St., within the historical district known as Paseo del Siglo.

The palace was projected in 1929 by the architects José Gerbino, Luis Schwarz and Juan Bautista Durand, who were commissioned by Domingo Minetti, a vegetable oil and mill industry businessman, for the design of new corporate headquarters for Minetti y Compañía. It was built by Candia y Cía., and finished around 1931.

The building is considered one of the finest examples of Art Deco in the city. Its structure is based on a portal with four columns in red granite and a tall white façade ornamented with uniform rhomboids. At the top there is a stepped pyramid, crowned by bronze statues of two women holding a torch.
