= Plaza San Martín (Rosario) =

Coordinates: 32.943645°S 60.649676°W

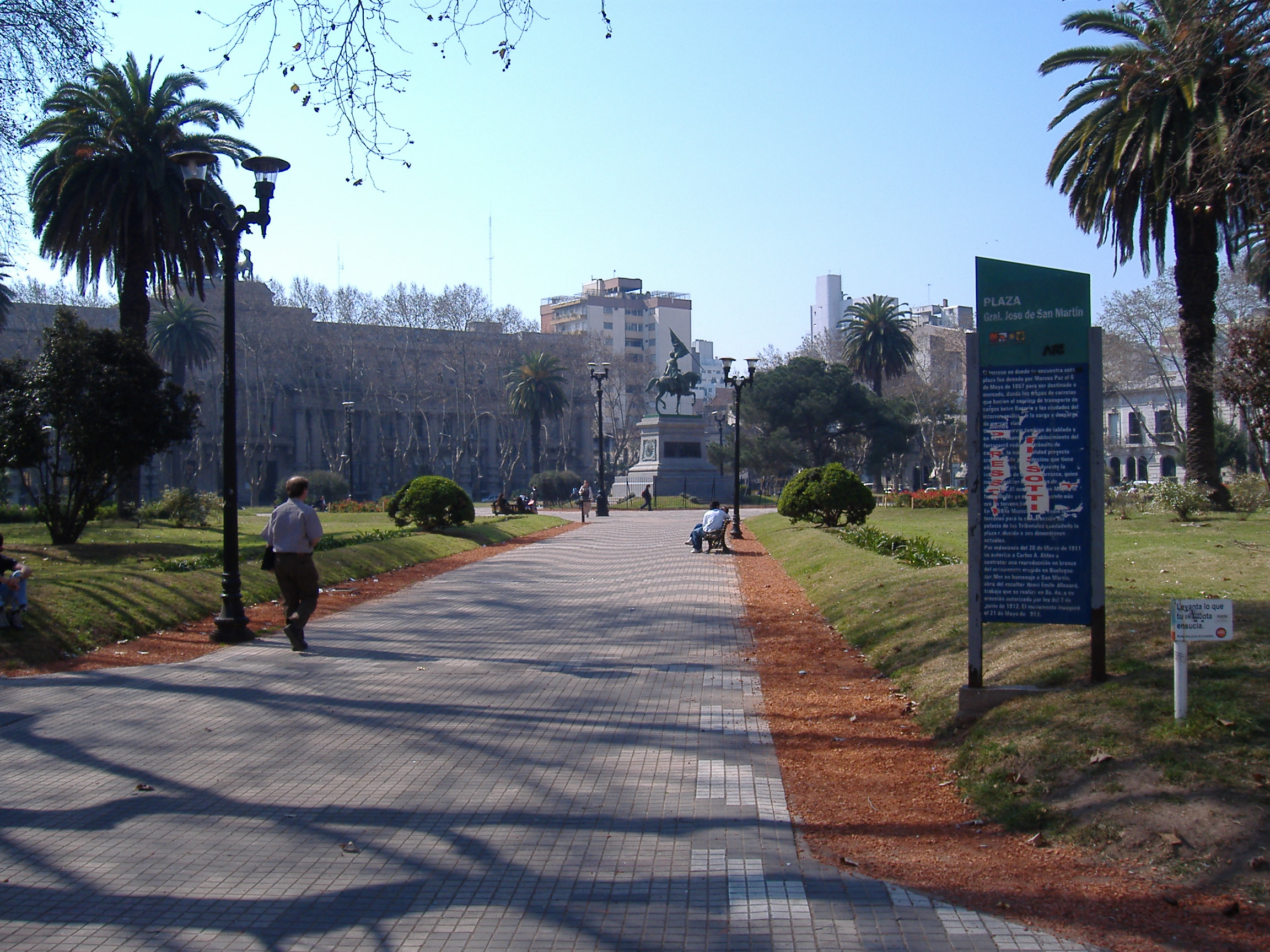
Plaza San Martín (facing northeast)

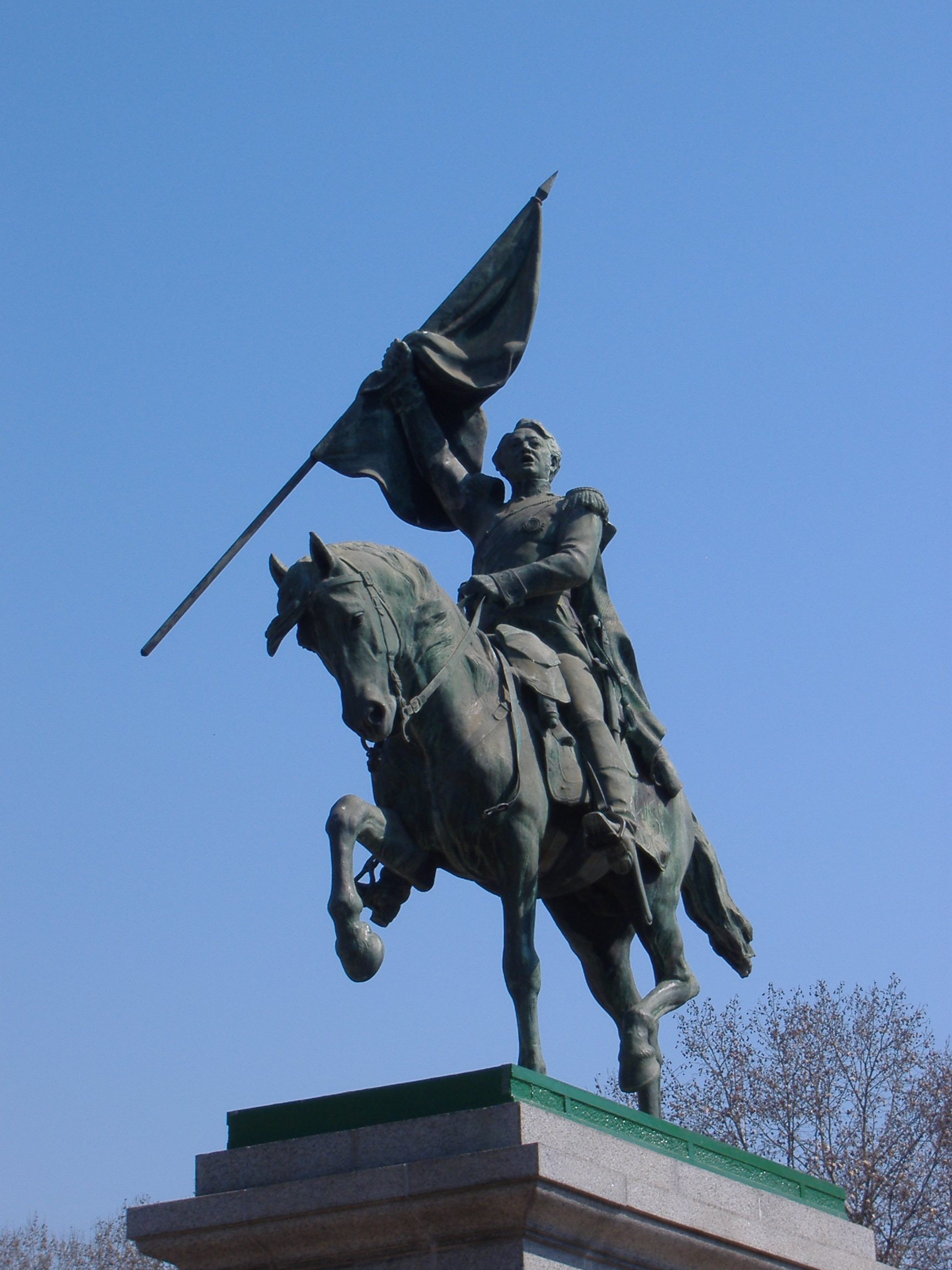
Statue of General José de San Martín, at the center of the plaza

Plaza San Martín (Spanish, San Martín Square) is a plaza (urban square) in Rosario, province of Santa Fe, Argentina. Its name is an homage to General José de San Martín, hero of the Argentine War of Independence.

Plaza San Martín is located in the downtown area of Rosario, occupying the block defined by Santa Fe St., Dorrego St., Córdoba St. and Moreno St., along the historical segment of Córdoba St. called Paseo del Siglo. In the center of the plaza there is a bronze statue of General José de San Martín, mounted on a horse and carrying a flag. The statue is a copy of a monument erected in the French city of Boulogne-sur-Mer (the place of San Martín's voluntary exile and death), and was inaugurated on 21 May 1913.

The plaza is flanked by important buildings, among them the former Tribunals Palace, now seat of the Faculty of Law of the National University of Rosario and of the Dr. Ángel Gallardo Provincial Natural Sciences Museum, and the former headquarters of the Santa Fe Provincial Police, now a delegation of the provincial government and host to a small museum of the last dictatorship (Centro Popular de la Memoria).

== History ==
The land where the plaza is located was donated by Marcos Paz in 1857, and was much larger than at present (extending several blocks to the south). Its purpose was to serve as a marketplace, where cargo wagons that came and went between Rosario and other cities farther away from the littoral would stop to load and unload.

When the railway system was established, in 1871, the municipal government projected to build a square, which was referred to as Plaza San Martín already in 1884, while it was still an empty lot. In 1888, the municipality gave up most of the land for the construction of the Tribunals, leaving the terrain with its current dimensions. In 1891 mayor Gabriel Carrasco had gardening works begin on the site.
