= Patio de la Madera =

Market on the city of Rosario, Argentina

Coordinates: 32.940152°S 60.669248°W

The Patio de la Madera, (Centro de Exposiciones y Convenciones Complejo Patio de la Madera) is a "Convention and Exposition Centre" complex located in Rosario, province of Santa Fe, Argentina, occupying two blocks opposite the Mariano Moreno Bus Terminal, near the geographic center of the city. The formal name is almost never used; the shorter form Centro de Convenciones Patio de la Madera is preferred even in official communications.

The main buildings provide room for conventions, lectures and conferences, artistic exhibitions and shows, etc., with an auditorium for 1,800 people and six smaller facilities with capacities between 120 and 370 people. There are 4,000 m^{2} of covered area for exhibitions (plus another 1,000 semi-covered and 7,200 outdoors).

The complex also includes two nightclubs, an amphitheater, a park area with modern sculptures and a small artificial lake, two international cuisine restaurants, a fast food restaurant, and parking space for 250 vehicles.

The site of the Patio de la Madera was a former train station, a terminal of the Ferrocarril General Manuel Belgrano railway company that was abandoned when, in 1987, the cargo facilities were shut down and the rails were removed. The site was gradually recovered by the municipal government, starting during the administration of Mayor Horacio Usandizaga. By the early 2000s it was already a well-known center for national and international cultural activities.
