= San Martín Street (Rosario) =

Street in Rosaria, Argentina

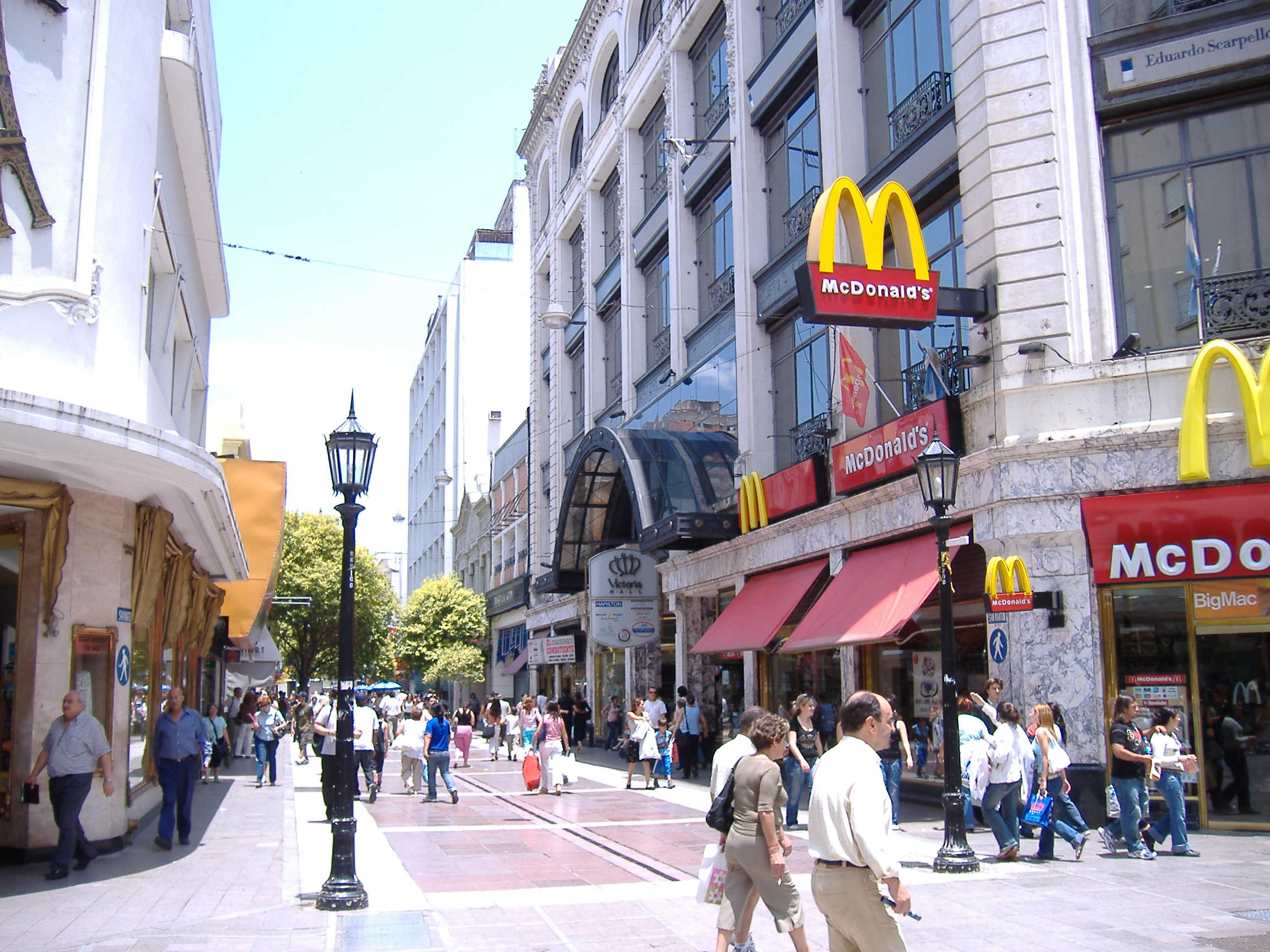
San Martín St. (facing south), at the intersection with Córdoba St. (32.9467°S 60.6367°W)

San Martín Street is an important street in Rosario, Santa Fe Province, Argentina. It runs north–south through the center of the city, from the coastal avenue by the Paraná River to the southern limit of the urbanized area (a total of 6.5 km). It was originally named Calle del Puerto ("Port Street"); the name was changed in 1887 to honour Independence War hero General José de San Martín.

San Martín St. starts near the river at Belgrano Avenue and climbs towards the downtown area. At the intersection with Santa Fe St. it is normally closed to traffic, and it becomes a highly commercial pedestrian-only street one block to the south, upon meeting Córdoba St. (also pedestrian-only at this point). It passes by the former Customs Office, the New Bank of Santa Fe and the Municipal Bank, several important hotels, the Monumental film theater, and the Bernardino Rivadavia Culture Center at Plaza Montenegro. The street returns to normal traffic four blocks later, at the intersection with Mendoza St.

South of 27 de Febrero Boulevard, San Martín St. becomes a two-way avenue (26 m wide) that serves the traffic of a large area in the southeast of Rosario. In this section there is a great number of stores, thus making it the commercial core of the southern neighbourhoods. San Martín Ave. then meets Beltway Avenue and the municipal limit marked by the Saladillo Stream, and continues into the jurisdiction of the city of Villa Gobernador Gálvez.
