= Freyre =

Frevre
Origin
- Origin: French
- Meaning: Brother in arms

Other names
- Alternative spelling: Freire
- Derived: frére
- Popularity: see popular names

Freyre originates from religious guards and soldiers. The name comes from the French word frère, or brother.

Notable people with the name include:

- Carolina Freyre (1844–1916), Peruvian poet, playwright, and novelist
- Fernando Freyre de Andrade (1903–1946), Spanish actor
- Gilberto Freyre (1900–1987), Brazilian scholar, writer, and politician
- Matías Freyre (born 1994), Argentinian rugby union player
- Rebecca R. Freyre (born 1959), American judge
- Ricardo Jaimes Freyre (1868–1933), Bolivian poet
- Susana Freyre (1929–2026), Argentine actress
