= Parque Alem =

Park in Rosario, Argentina

Coordinates: 32°54′38.30″S 60°40′45.38″W

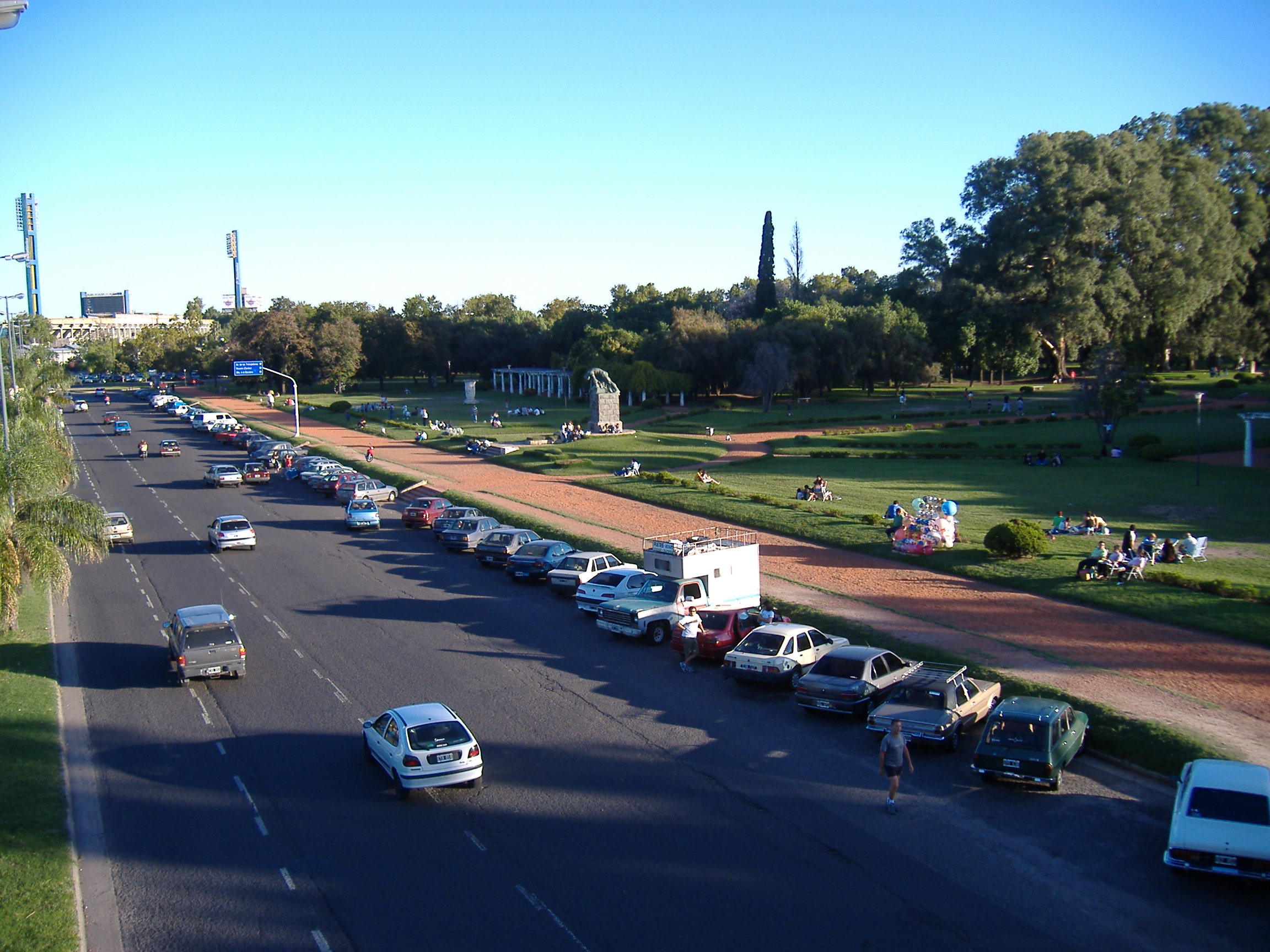
Part of the park, viewed from a pedestrian bridge.

The Parque Alem (Alem Park, full name Parque Leandro Nicéforo Alem) is a large public park in Rosario, province of Santa Fe, Argentina. It is located in the north of the city, beside the Paraná River, overlooking its islands. Its name is a homage to 19th-century political leader Leandro Alem; the park features a statue in his honor.

The park includes amusement games for children, a cultural center, a public pool complex, a camping site of the Municipal Workers Union, and the piers of the Fishermen's Center. The mouth of the Ludueña Stream marks its northern border. Close to the park lie the stadium of the Rosario Central football team and the Sorrento thermal power plant.
