= Barrio Pichincha =

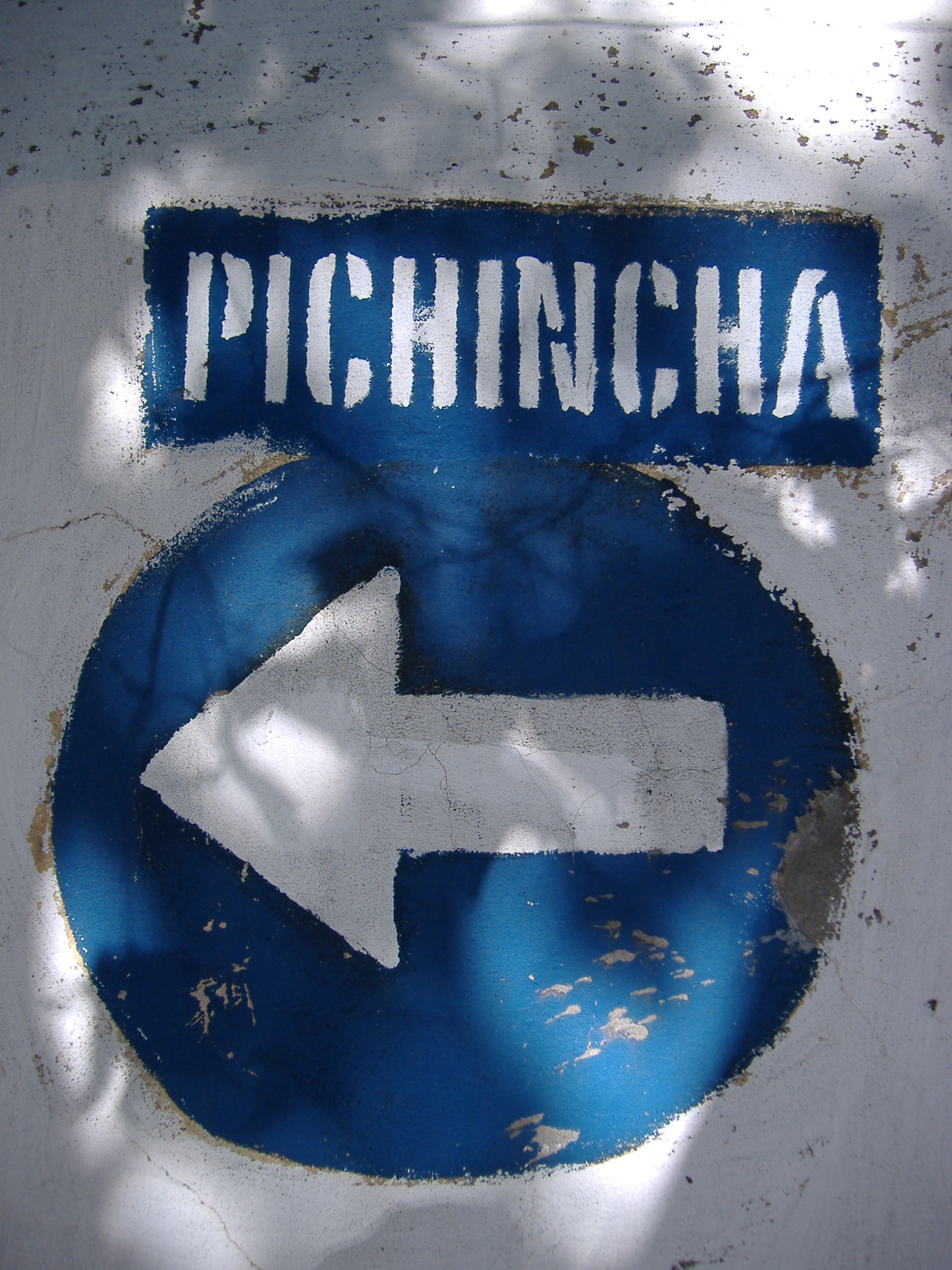
A street sign properly marked Pichincha St., formerly Ricchieri St.

Pichincha is a barrio (small district or neighbourhood) in the city of Rosario, province of Santa Fe, Argentina. It is located on the north-east part of the central area of the city, and its limits are Vera Mujica St., Cordoba St., Oroño Boulevard, and Del Valle Avenue.

The assembling of this barrio was motivated by the growth of the railway lines and the activity at the port due to agricultural exports, in the 19th century. The most important point in the neighbourhood was the Sunchales train station (now Rosario Norte), which marked the border between the populated urbanization and the developing suburbia. The station was also a tramway terminal.

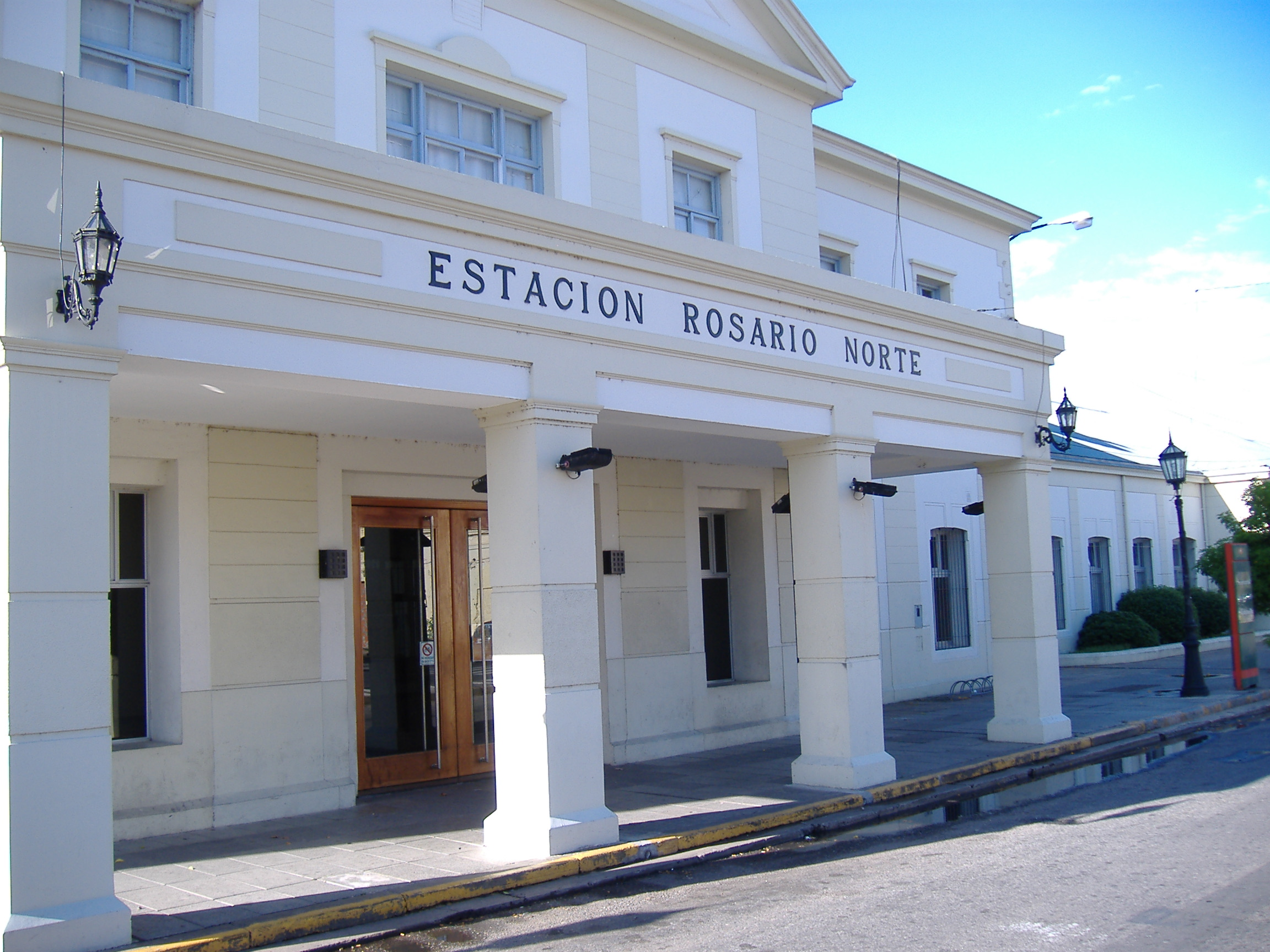
Rosario Norte Station.

The main street in the barrio was Pichincha St., named after a battle in the Ecuadorian War of Independence. This name was then changed to Ricchieri (after General Pablo Ricchieri, a Minister of War of late 19th century). At the beginning of the 2000s, the municipal government revised history and rolled back the change, although the name Ricchieri still appears in most street signs as of 2006.

Demographic growth of the city favoured the establishment of brothels. Since many of them were illegal, the municipality tried to control and set up a specific zone for them. Pichincha then became a kind of red-light district. In time, the Argentine railway system declined and the activity and attraction of the barrio diminished.

In the first years of the 21st century, Pichincha started to recover, based on initiatives of its neighbours supported by the government. Since then, the barrio features a culture centre and several high-profile bars and restaurants, which take advantage of the retro appeal of the neighbourhood. The old structures have been preserved or restored. The municipality has encouraged this trend further, for example by employing old-fashioned street lampposts instead of modern lighting along Rivadavia Avenue. Since 2002 the Culture Secretariat of Rosario has a seat in the former Rosario Norte station. Each Sunday, Rivadavia Avenue is cut to host a Retro Fair (Feria Retro "La Huella") where kiosks offer antiques and there are open-air tango and theatre performances, open radio, puppet shows and others. The barrio also has a number of modern bars and discos.
