= Oroño Boulevard =

Street in Rosario, Argentina

Location of Oroño Boulevard in Rosario.

Oroño Boulevard (in Spanish, Bulevar Oroño) is a street in Rosario, Santa Fe Province, Argentina. It is a two-way boulevard that runs north–south through the center-east of the city, from the coastal avenue by the Paraná River to the southern limit of the urbanized area. Together with the river and Pellegrini Avenue, it also marks the unofficial limit of the downtown area.

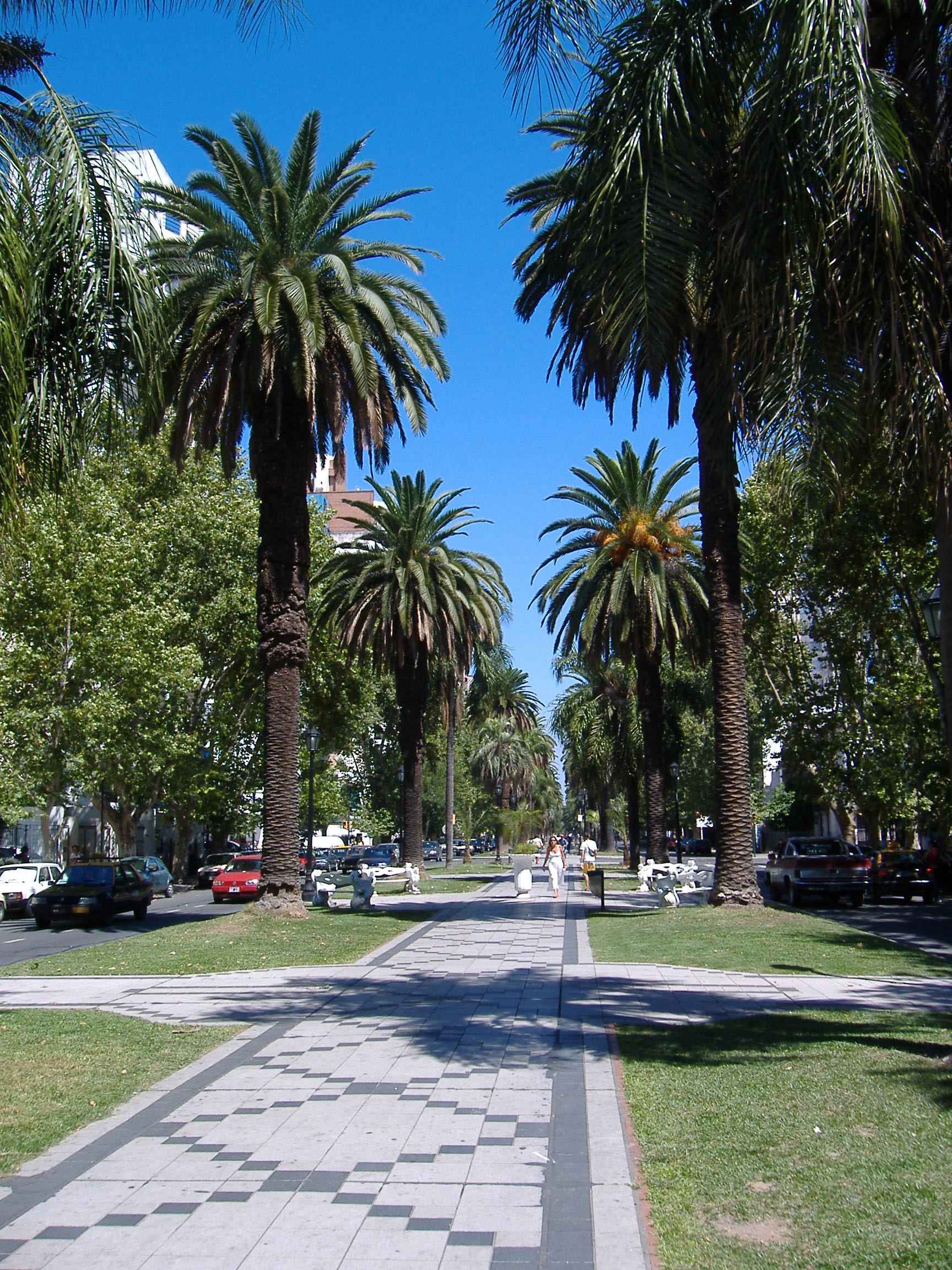
Central reservation.

The downtown segment of the boulevard hosts a number of historical buildings and mansions formerly belonging to wealthy local families, in some cases transformed into institutional buildings (such as schools and private hospitals). The central reservation is wide, lined with palm trees, and includes a tiled pedestrian area and a cycleway. The lanes themselves are comparatively narrow.

The boulevard was inaugurated in 1868 as Bulevar Santafesino, as part of a program of the municipality (created 6 years before) to beautify the city, then home to 23,000 residents, and which also included the opening of Pellegrini Avenue (then Bulevar Argentino). Initially 18 blocks long, it was chosen by many wealthy families of the time to build mansions, many of which still persist. Its name was changed in 1904 to honor Nicasio Oroño, former Intendant of Rosario and governor of Santa Fe, upon his death.

== See also ==
- Geography of Rosario
