= Córdoba Street (Rosario) =

Street in Rosario, Argentina

Location of Córdoba St. in Rosario.

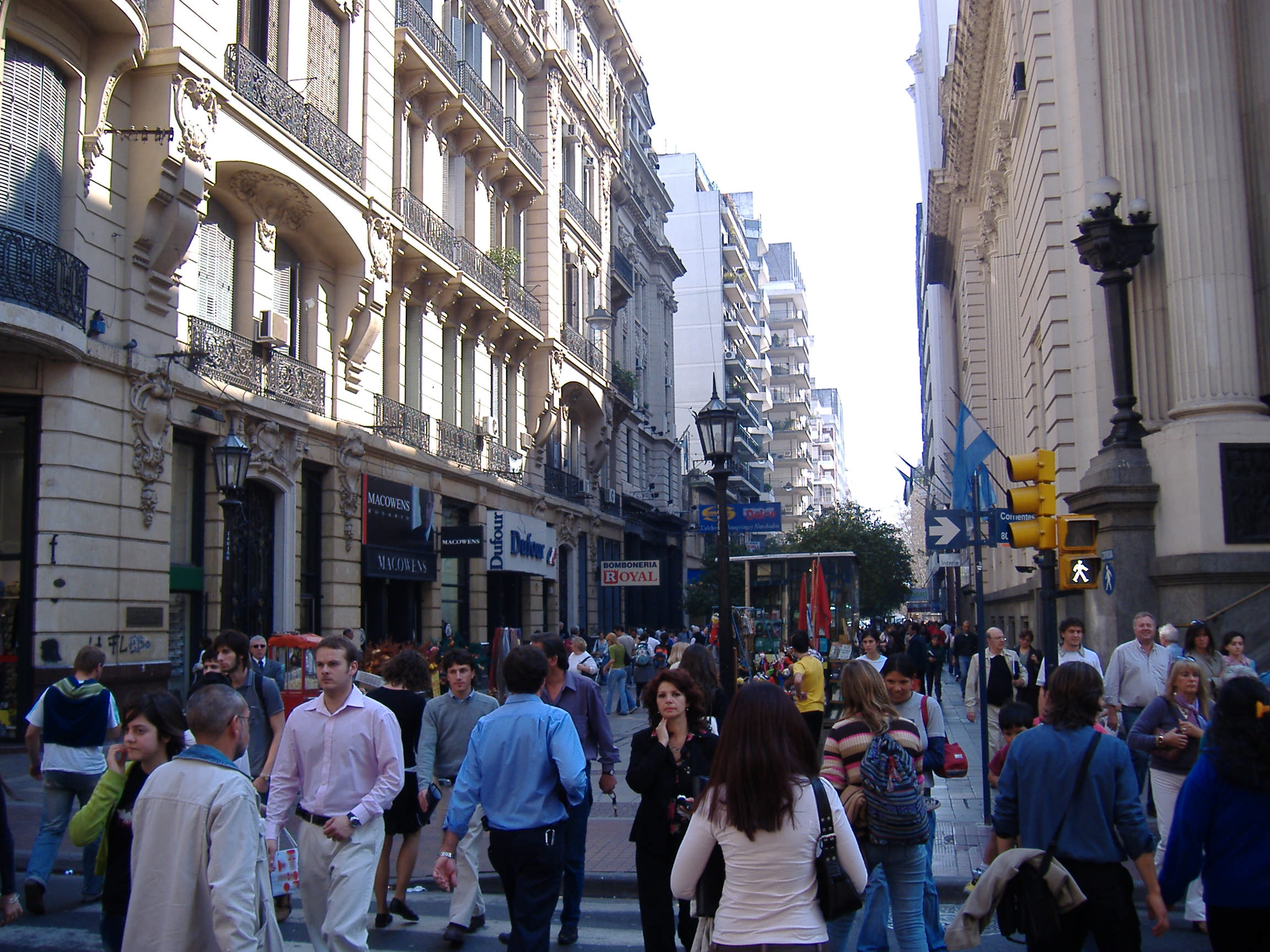
Corner of Peatonal Córdoba and Corrientes Ave.

Córdoba Street is one of the most important streets in Rosario, Santa Fe Province, Argentina. It runs east–west through the center of the city, from the coastal avenue by the Paraná River to the western limit of the urbanized area.

Córdoba St. starts near the river at Belgrano Avenue, by the National Flag Memorial, and climbs towards the core downtown area. It passes through the historical center of the city, marked by the legislative house (Palacio Vassallo), the Cathedral, the Central Post Office, the town hall (Palacio de los Leones), and Plaza 25 de Mayo.

The street then becomes pedestrian-only for seven blocks, between Laprida St. and Paraguay St. This is the heart of the banking sector and hosts many other businesses, such as stores (the local branches of Falabella and C&A), tourism agencies, shopping galleries, etc.

The next eight blocks, from Paraguay St. to Oroño Boulevard, form the Paseo del Siglo (Tour of the Century), where many historical buildings have been preserved under a municipal program.

The street continues west and passes by the Patio de la Madera complex (which includes a park and lecture rooms employed for congresses and exhibitions) and the Bus Terminal. Later on, upon crossing Avellaneda Boulevard, it changes its name to Eva Perón Avenue.

About 5 km from its beginning, Córdoba St. meets Santa Fe St. and becomes a two-way street, with a narrow central reservation, as it passes by the Village Cinemas complex.

Upon entering the suburbs, the street leads to the municipal limit and the access to National Route 9.
