= Penitenciaría Nacional (Buenos Aires) =

Old jail in Buenos Aires

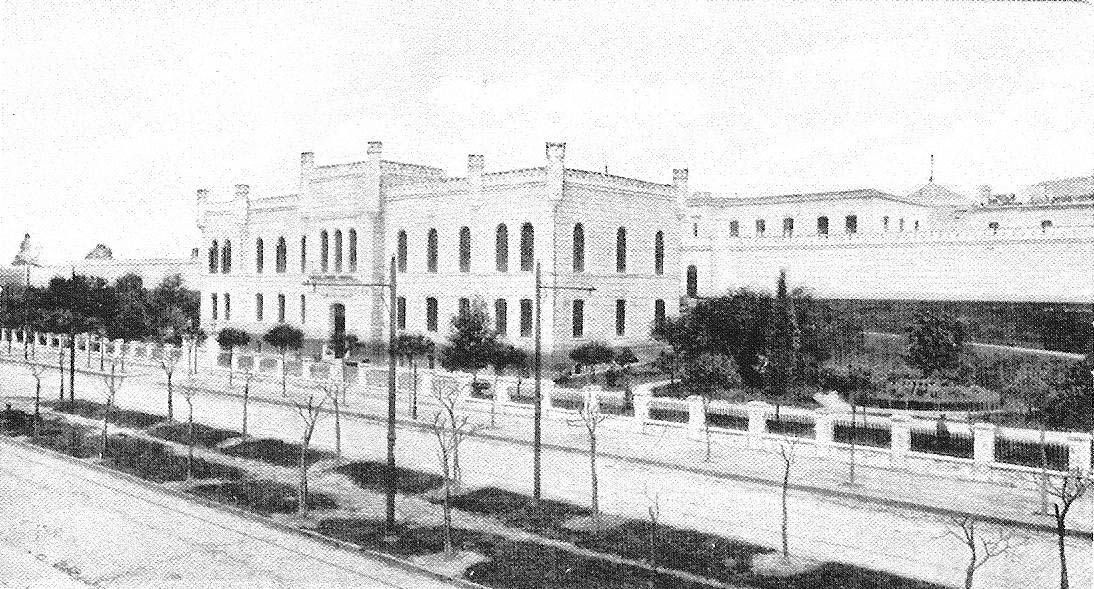
Penitenciaría Nacional in 1900

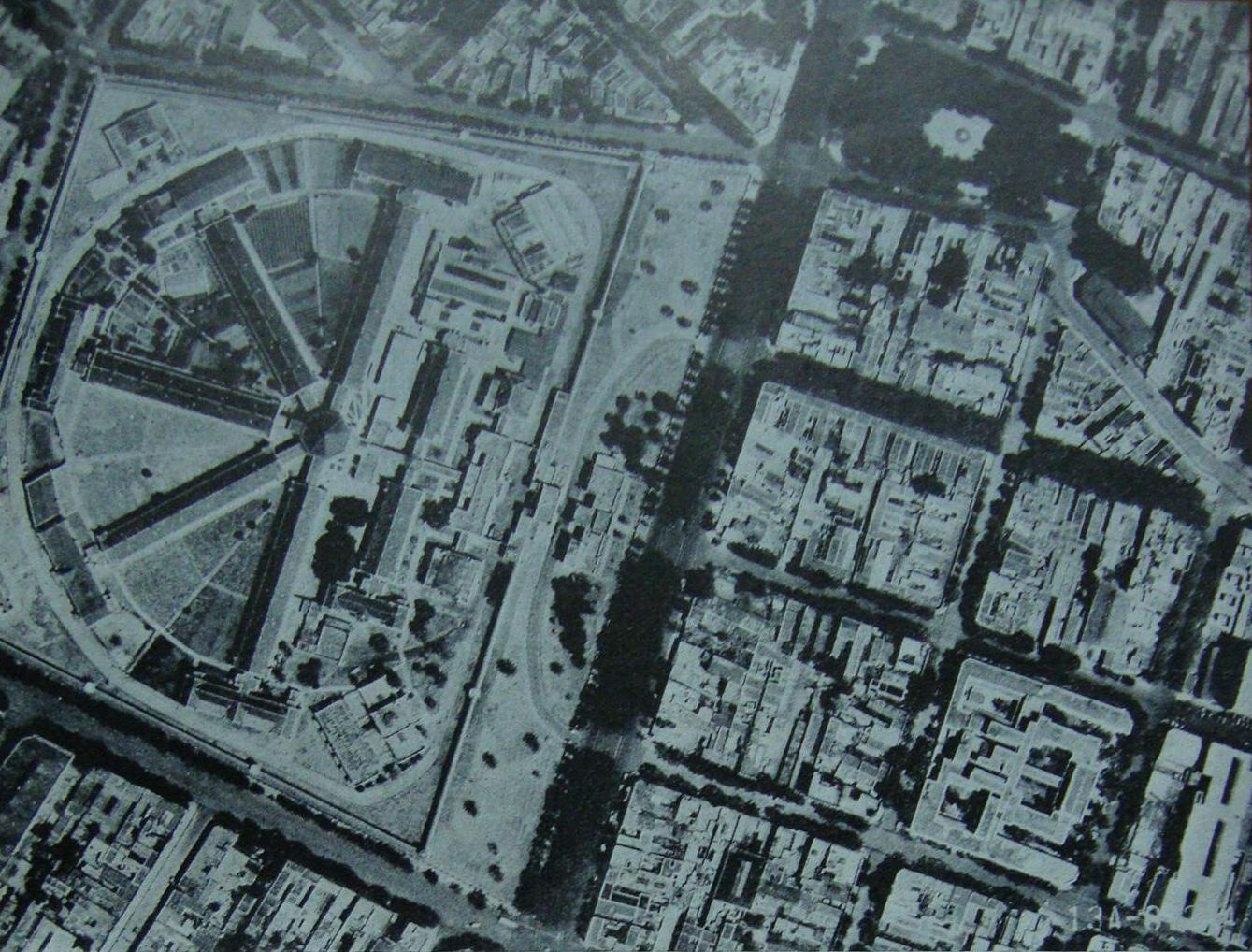
Penitenciaría Nacional in 1939

In the jurisdiction of the Servicio Penitenciario Federal (SPF), La Penitenciaría Nacional was an imposing building on Las Heras Avenue (named in memoriam of Gral. Juan Gregorio de Las Heras), in the Palermo neighborhood of Buenos Aires, Argentina, until it was demolished in 1962.

== National penitentiary ==
The city called for "Plans and Budgets for the Construction of a Jail Building", in 1869 by decree, with the penal standards of the time; the attempt was to fulfill the constitutional rules of 1853: Art. 18. This, a system of humiliating repression, was the model for the time, with prisoners who were worked hard and didn't have uniforms.

Construction began in 1872 with the plans of the architect Ernesto Bunge. The design of the prison was modelled after England's Pentonville Prison. Construction was finished in 1877. A penitentiary regime system and a plan for working the prisoners were adopted and officers were hired. Enrique O´Gorman was the “Governor of the Penitentiary” and was independent of Judicial Power. It was inaugurated on 28 of May 1877, with one disguised opening. This “medieval castle” was filled with 300 prisoners who had overpopulated the Town hall Penitentiary. Geographically, the Penitentiary was in the Province of Buenos Aires. Its walls were punctuated with towers and sentry boxes for prison guards. It was in a smooth ravine, with an iron gate.

== Prison management ==
- In one area: offices of the governor, courtrooms with other offices.
- In another area: main entrance of the penitentiary; administration; prison entrance hall.
- Cellular system: cells distributed on two floors; an attic with a kitchen and laundry facilities; a chapel in the center of the hallway system, placed so that all prisoners could reach it with ease; and gardens for gardening work. Its structure and conception were designed for security; the pavilions were located in two floors centered in a strategic observation post. The system was: nighttime isolation in individual cells, morning work in factories, and rest on patios, with strict silence. In each cell were two lists of rules: "Reglas para el Preso" (rules for the prisoner), with disciplinary punishments, and "Instrucción para el Arreglo de la Celda" (instruction for the maintenance of the cell”).

There were two categories of inmates: penados (convicts) and encausados (defendants). The state of living in the penitentiary was improved under the direction of Antonio Ballvé, between 1904 and 1909. He asked that José Ingenieros visit the prison and study its system. He studied the prisoners and their physical characteristics, a system of reward and punishment was set up, and the silence regime was eliminated. With time the norms were made flexible; visits to intimates began, the visitor was allowed to say their name to the prisoners, and the shackles and striped uniforms ceased to exist under the direction of Roberto Pettinato, in the government of Juan Perón. The patios were made into orchards. It had a factory to supply to the penitentiary and other public institutions.

== Later history and demolition ==
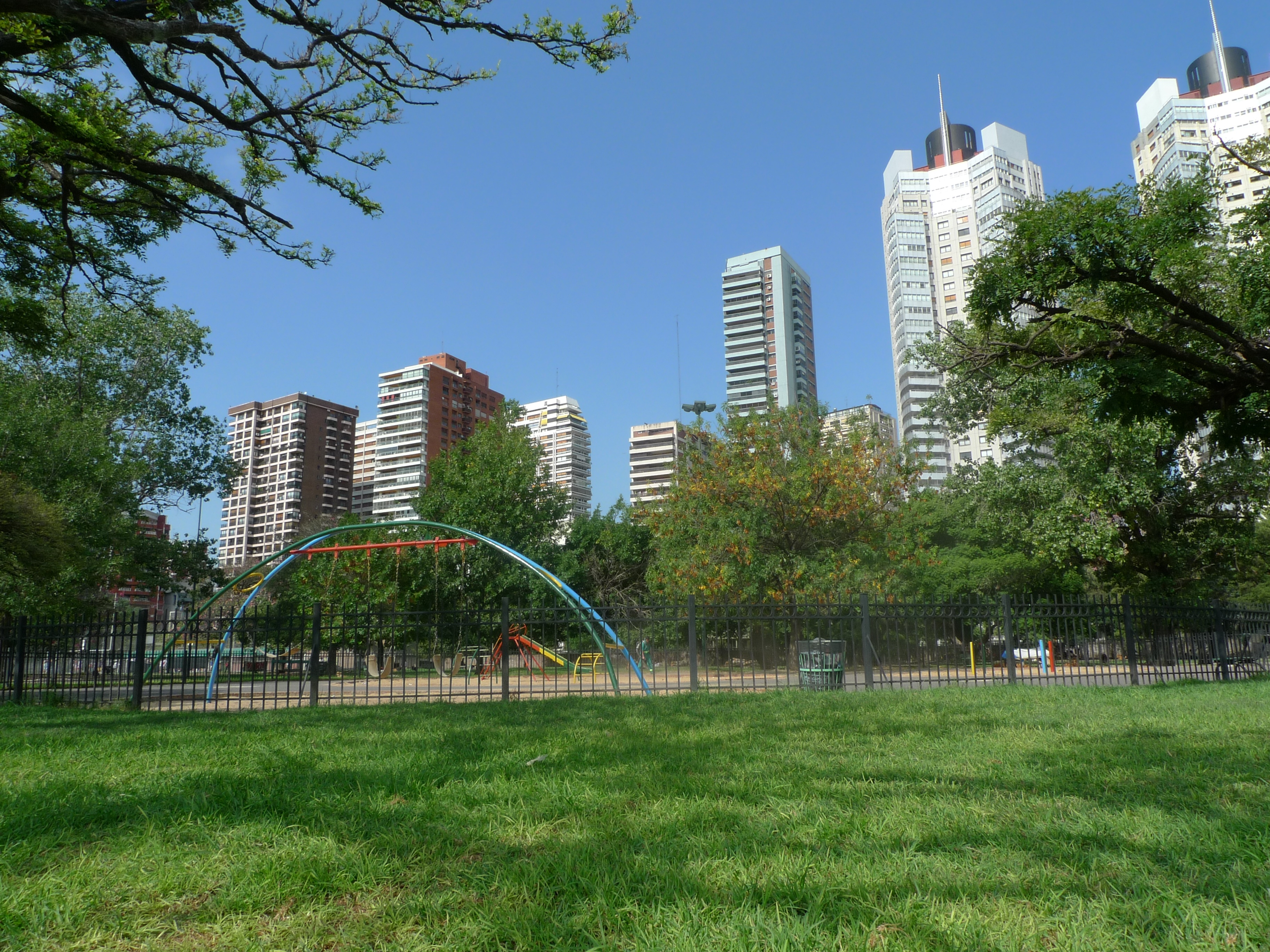
Las Heras Park, pictured 2009.

In 1899, the first recorded escape happened at the prison, when Fernández Sampiño eluded guards with a piece of clothing smuggled to him by a visitor.

In 1909, new city-planning began. Soon the building, with its resemblance to a castle and its great walls, was in a rich, populated, and elegant district. In 1911, thirteen inmates working in the garden escaped by digging a well to the outside. 1923, 14 prisoners escaped through a narrow tunnel, but more would have escaped if the fifteenth prisoner hadn't gotten stuck. In 1931, anarchists Paulino Scarfó and Severino Di Giovanni were executed at the prison. In 1956, Juan José Valle was executed at the prison. In 1960, the last escape took place, by Jorge Villarino, a criminal who would become known for his escapes.

The prison remained in operation until 1961. Demolition began on September 6, 1961, and ended on February 5, 1962. Over time, the penitentiary became outdated: the prison population increased to the point where it was no longer efficient. This was not a lesson only for this prison, it taught other prisons to avoid the problems of this regime: carelessness, lack of hygiene, general discomfort, etc. Rather, prisons learned to make conditions in the prison more adequate.

Today, Las Heras Park sits on the site of the historic prison. In 2020, archelogists digging at the park found some of the remains of the former prison, including shoe soles, bricks and pipes.

== Notable prisoners ==
- Juan Moreira
- Cayetano Domingo Grossi, executed 1900
- Cayetano Santos Godino
- Francisco Salvatto and Giovanni Lauro, who would spark "penal tourism" to the penitentiary

== See also ==
- Penal colony
- Penal code
