= Tren Hospital ALMA =

Geography
- Location: Santiago del Estero Province, Catamarca Province, Salta Province, Jujuy Province, Chaco Province, Tucumán Province, Argentina

Organisation
- Type: Specialist

Services
- Speciality: Mobile children's hospital

Links
- Lists: Hospitals in Argentina

Tren Hospital ALMA is a mobile children's hospital in Argentina. Operating in a train (see hospital train), It treats children in the Northwest region of the country outside of cities (Santiago del Estero Province, Catamarca Province, Salta Province, Jujuy Province, Chaco Province, and Tucumán Province) where healthcare is not otherwise available. This hospital provides medical and dental care, and health education at no cost to volunteers. The hospital also contributes to local teacher training on health issues.

== History ==
As of 2010, the mobile hospital has treated 170 trips and has served 80,000 children during 30 years in operation since 1980, at roughly 4500 per year. Sometimes also adults are treated, but most severe cases are left to local hospitals and some to the city of Buenos Aires. Cases of tuberculosis, Chagas disease and parasites are treated repeatedly in the Tren ALMA.

According to a 2003 interview with then-president and pediatric surgeon Martin Urtasun, the train left once a month, making 8-9 trips per year, each lasting 15 days with about 15 professional volunteers on board and helping roughly 500 to 600 children per trip. It is reported that in 2010, each trip costed about €3,300. The name 'alma train' translates to 'soul train' in English and running costs were funded entirely on donations.
