= Hospital Borda =

Coordinates: 34°38′13″S 58°23′02″W

Hospital Interdisciplinario Psicoasistencial José Tiburcio Borda
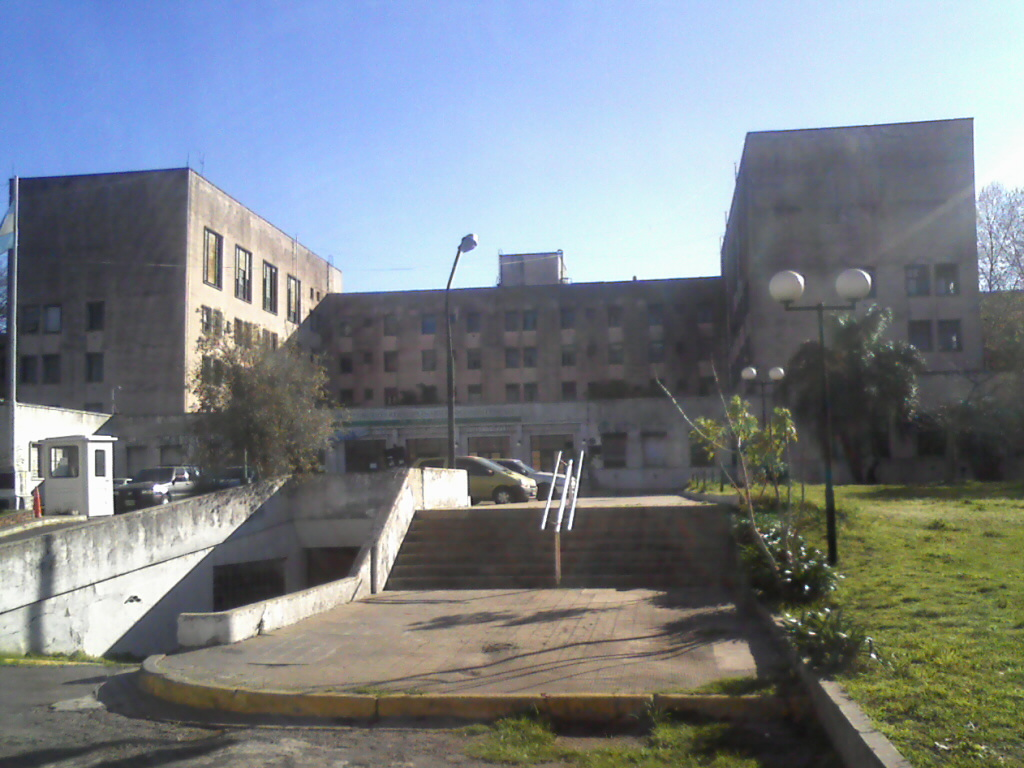

Geography
- Location: Calle Ramón Carrillo, Barracas, Buenos Aires, Argentina

Organisation
- Type: Municipal
- Affiliated university: University of Buenos Aires

History
- Founded: 1865

Links
- Lists: Hospitals in Argentina
- Other links: List of hospitals in Argentina

The Hospital Interdisciplinario Psicoasistencial José Tiburcio Borda (alternate: Municipal Hospital of José Tiburcio Borda; nickname: El Borda) is the largest and most notable psychiatric hospital in Argentina. Situated on 20 hectares (49 acres), El Borda is located on Calle Ramón Carrillo, Barracas, Buenos Aires, next to the Child and Adolescent Neuropsychiatric Hospital Garcia Tobar.

== History ==
The hospital was founded in 1863 as Hospicio de San Buenaventura, renamed Hospicio de las Mercedes in 1888, and renamed to National Neuropsychiatric Hospital for Men in 1949. The last name change occurred in 1967 to honor the psychiatrist Dr. Jose Tiburcio Borda who joined the UBA Medical School faculty in 1891 and began working at Hospicio de las Mercedes shortly thereafter, staying on until his retirement in 1930. Before becoming known as Borda, the facility housed notorious serial killer Cayetano Santos Godino, who spent only a few weeks at the hospital before being moved to prison after he attacked two vulnerable patients.

In the mid-2000s, members of the Argentine rock band, Bersuit, wore pastel pajamas, like escapees from a lunatic asylum, as a tribute to El Borda. In 2008, the Buenos Aires government announced plans to close two psychiatric hospitals, El Borda and Braulio Moyano Mental Health Hospital, replacing them with ten smaller hospitals, halfway houses, and health centres. But two years later, the Ministry of Health stated that the government would not be closing El Borda. Graffiti covers many of El Borda's walls including the phrase No al cierre ("No to closure").

== Facility ==
El Borda is built in the shape of the letter 'H', and has two wings on either sides of the main hospital, separated by garden areas. The large, park-like area is enclosed behind high bars. The hospital offers mental health services and a research centre linked to the University of Buenos Aires medical faculty. Admissions and discharges total approximately 1,300 patients each year, most within two weeks. Over 800 other patients are long term residents. Dr. Juan Garralda is the current director.

Of the several wards within the hospital, one, Penal Unit 20 Diego Alcorta, houses patients that are violent and come from the prison. It is a men's forensic ward operated by the Federal Penitentiary Service, nowadays and fortunately this Unit is out of service, and the hospital remain without it.

== Patient groups ==
The hospital has developed patient and ex-patient groups that have contact outside of the institution. These include Borda Artists' Front (Fraente de Artistas del Borda), Radio Colifata (Radio La Colifata), and Bread of Borda (Pan del Borda).

Radio La Colifata

Radio La Colifata (Lunfardo: "the crazy woman") is the world's first radio station broadcast from inside a mental hospital. A noncommercial radio station, it was founded at El Borda by psychologist Alfredo Olivera. In 1990, Olivera began recording patients' discussions centered around a particular theme, and then he transmitted the recording on the radio, after which listeners called in with responses, and these Olivera played back to El Borda residents. Two years later, live transmissions began from inside the hospital. La Colifata is run by psychiatric patients in a makeshift studio. Support comes from the Argentine announcer, Lalo Mir, and the Argentine footballer, Oscar Ruggeri. Programming includes sports and the "Borda Tango Club". The station produces microprograms of four hours per week which are distributed to dozens of radio stations, both in Argentina and Latin America. Psychiatric facilities in other countries, such as Argentina, Chile, Germany, Spain, and Uruguay have subsequently developed similar programs.

Pan del Borda

Pan del Borda ("Bread of Borda") is a collectively operated panadería ("bakery") at El Borda, employing up to 15 of the residents who bake goods that are delivered within the hospital and to the UBA Faculty of Psychology.

Eating Disorders Day Hospital During 2000, a new unit was designed for eating disorder patient's treatment. It functions as an interdisciplinary group team approach.

== See also ==
- Hospital de Emergencias Psiquiátricas Marcelo Torcuato de Alvear
- Domingo Cabred
