= Nicolas Yunes =

Argentinian theoretical physicist

Nicolás Yunes
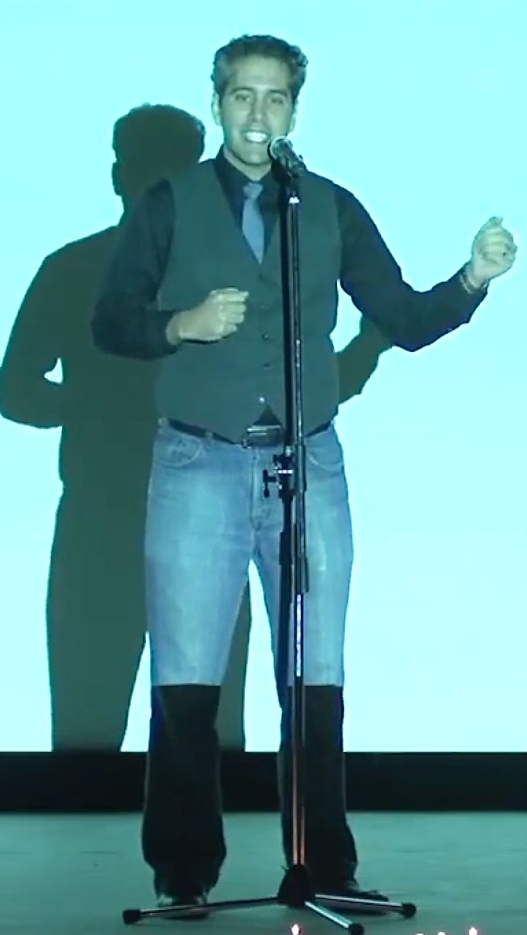
- Yunes speaks on the Physics-Poetry Duality at PechaKucha Bozeman, Montana, in 2014
- Born: 1980 (age 45–46)
- Education: Pennsylvania State University; Washington University in St. Louis
- Scientific career
- Workplaces: Montana State University; University of Illinois Urbana-Champaign; Princeton University; Massachusetts Institute of Technology
- Thesis: At the interface : gravitational waves as tools to test quantum gravity and probe the astrophysical universe (2008)

Nicolás Yunes (born July 17, 1980) is an Argentinian theoretical physicist who is a professor at the University of Illinois Urbana-Champaign and the founding director of the Illinois Center for Advanced Studies of the Universe (ICASU). He is particularly interested in extreme gravity, gravitational waves, and compact binaries.

== Early life and education ==
Yunes was born in Buenos Aires, Argentina. He was an undergraduate student at Washington University in St. Louis, where he studied physics and graduated in 2003. Yunes moved to Pennsylvania State University for graduate studies, where he proposed gravitational waves a way to test for quantum gravity inspired features in the gravitational waves emitted by compact binaries. During his doctoral research he worked as a science monitor at the LIGO Hanford Observatory. From 2008 to 2010, he worked as a research associate at Princeton University. In 2010, Yunes joined Massachusetts Institute of Technology as an Einstein Fellow.

== Research and career ==
In 2011, Yunes joined the faculty at Montana State University as an assistant professor. After being promoted to an associate professor in 2016 he stayed at Montana State University until 2019 and co-founded the eXtreme Gravity Institute, XGI, at Montana State University. He was made a professor at the University of Illinois Urbana-Champaign in 2019. Yunes studies general relativity and gravitation. He was one of the creators of the parametrized post-Einsteinian framework, a proposed formalism to test Einstein's theory of general relativity with gravitational waves.

Yunes extracted astrophysical information from the Neutron Star Interior Composition Explorer (NICER), a NASA payload that was installed in the International Space Station, in 2017. The instrument can perform high precision measurements of neutron stars. By combining the X-ray data from NICER with gravitational wave information from advanced LIGO, Yunes is able to test nuclear physics and general relativity.

Yunes worked on the European Space Agency Laser Interferometer Space Antenna (LISA). He is particularly interested in how effectively LISA can test general relativity with gravitational waves emitted by compact binaries. One such system is extreme mass ratio inspirals (EMRIs), in which a small black hole orbits around a much heavier one, and gradually spirals in due to the emission of gravitational waves. These investigations can test whether Einstein was correct about the behaviour of gravity in extreme environments.

In 2020, Yunes and Clifford M. Will wrote a popular science book about gravitational waves and testing Einstein's theories of gravity. In 2022, Yunes and M. Coleman Miller wrote a physics textbook on gravitational waves with applications to nuclear physics, cosmology, astrophysics, and tests of general relativity.

== Awards and honors ==
- 2008 Pennsylvania State University Alumni Dissertation Award
- 2009 International Society on General Relativity and Gravitation The Jürgen Ehlers Thesis Prize
- 2010 NASA Einstein Fellowship
- 2013 Montana State University College of Letters and Science Fellow in Engagement
- 2013 National Science Foundation CAREER Award
- 2015 General Relativity and Gravitation Young Scientist Prize
- 2017 Fox Faculty Award for Outstanding Research
- 2022 Fellow of the American Physical Society

== Selected publications ==
- Alexander S.; Yunes N. (2009). "Chern-Simons modified general relativity". Physics Reports. 480: 1–55. arXiv:0907.2562. Bibcode:2009PhR...480....1A. doi:10.1016/j.physrep.2009.07.002. ISSN 0370-1573. Wikidata Q68402803.
- Kent Yagi; Nicolas Yunes (1 July 2013). "I-Love-Q: unexpected universal relations for neutron stars and quark stars". Science. 341 (6144): 365–368. arXiv:1302.4499. doi:10.1126/science.1236462. ISSN 0036-8075. PMID 23888033. Wikidata Q87150580.

== Personal life ==
Yunes was married in 2008 and has one daughter, born in 2014 . Yunes is the son of Zoila Lorenzo and Dr. Roberto A. Yunes, the former director of the Hospital Tobar García.
