= The Southern Star (Montevideo) =

Bilingual newspaper edited in Montevideo, Uruguay

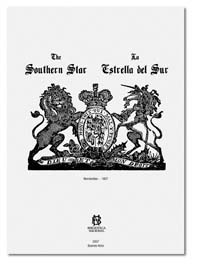
Front page of the newspaper

The Southern Star, also known in Spanish as La Estrella del Sur (both English and Spanish names were used in conjunction) was a weekly bilingual British propaganda newspaper edited in Montevideo, Uruguay, in 1807. It was the first newspaper edited in the city, but it only lasted for a couple of months, while Montevideo was under British occupation during the second British invasions of the Río de la Plata. The newspaper, a private business sponsored by the British Army, was used to promote free trade and loyalty to the British Crown. The chief editor was, according to most authors, General John Whitelocke's aide Thomas Bradford. The translator was Manuel Aniceto Padilla, a journalist from Upper Peru and sibling-in-law of future female guerrilla leader of the Independence War, Juana Azurduy. Padilla fled to Britain after the British debacle. Padilla came back to Buenos Aires after the May Revolution.

The Real Audiencia of Buenos Aires forbade the distribution or possession of those newspapers in the city of Buenos Aires, with the unauthorized possession charged as treason against the King and the State. The lawyer Mariano Moreno was requested to write editorials countering the opinions held by the newspaper. However, Moreno refused to do so because, even while he remained loyal to the Spanish crown, he still thought that some of the criticism of the Spanish colonial government by the newspaper were right.

The newspaper was closed after the defeat and withdrawal of the British troops, and the printing machines were confiscated and sent to Buenos Aires, where the local government donated them to funding the Casa de Niños Expósitos, then the main public orphanage in the city and today's Hospital Pedro de Elizalde. The machines were also used to teach the art of printing to the pupils.

== See also ==
- British invasions of the Río de la Plata
- Battle of Montevideo
