= Hospital Tobar García =

Coordinates: 34°38′12″S 58°22′57″W

Hospital Infanto Juvenil Dra. Carolina Tobar Garcia

Geography
- Location: Calle Ramón Carrillo, Barracas, Buenos Aires, Argentina

Organisation
- Type: Municipal

Services
- Beds: 64

History
- Founded: 1968

Links
- Lists: Hospitals in Argentina
- Other links: List of hospitals in Argentina

Hospital Infanto Juvenil Dra. Carolina Tobar Garcia (nickname: Tobar Garcia) is a psychiatric hospital for children and young people in Barracas, Buenos Aires, Argentina. Founded in 1968, it is named for Dra Carolina Tobar Garcia (1897–1962), who was notable in Argentina in the field of child and adolescent neuropsychiatry.

Tobar Garcia is one of the five neuropsychiatric institutes in Buenos Aires, and the only facility in the city that specializes in mental illness in children and adolescents. Dr. Rodolfo Cerrutti was the first director (1968 to 1973); Dr. Roberto A. Yunes is the current director. The hospital has agreements with various universities for training, teaching, and research.

== History ==
Tobar Garcia was founded in 1968, two years after its construction started; in-patient services began in 1969 with a contingent of children from Montes de Oca in Belgrano Department, Santa Fe. The first team of professional and volunteer staff worked with children and teenagers at Hospital Borda. When the hospital opened a call for nurses, almost all of them came from the Centre National Tisiologico. In 1974, rehabilitation placed an emphasis on artistic activities and later social psychiatry. In 1976, with the advent of military rule, the hospital's level of care deteriorated. In 1993, the hospital was transferred under the jurisdiction of the Municipality of the City of Buenos Aires within the Municipal Hospital Health Network.

== Facility ==
The building, abandoned since the late 1950s, had originally been intended for use as a nursing school. After 40 years without repairs, remodeling began in 2006. After a year and a half, only half of the work was completed, resulting in the workers going on strike and the community staging a festival. In 2007, there were 766 consultation visits, increasing by 13% in 2010 to 879, while benefits declined 19 percent. By 2010, the delayed work included a seven-story central tower, kitchen, laboratory, classrooms, and administrative offices.

== Services ==
Tobar Garcia provides mental healthcare to children, adolescents, and their families in settings for the individual, family, couples, and group therapy. The hospital has 64 beds, and provides intensive ambulatory care for an additional 100 children and 18 adolescents. Patient care extends to age 18.

The hospital services offered under its various specialized departments are:

Department of Psychiatry and Psychopathology

The Department of Psychiatry and Psychopathology works with adolescent children. It provides assessment of their family, school and the general environment in which they live, and acts as referral for the acute problems of chronic patients.

Ancillary services

The ancillary services that cater to various types of patients treated in the hospital are: the Neurology and Electroencephalography (EEG) provides services related diagnosis, treatment and monitoring of neurological disorders concerned with psychiatric disorders including use of diagnostic tools of EEGs, imaging and electromyogram; speech therapy provides diagnosis and treatment of disorders of speech and language pathology supplemented with assistance to parents to in the field of language; Department of Rehabilitation where individual attention are given to cases which need therapeutic process; occupational Therapy where the approach is to assess the clinical condition of children with severe developmental disorders with emphasis in the areas of self and the game and its development; and music therapy addressees the communication, expression, creativity to establish therapeutic relationship. In addition to the Center for Child Traumatic Stress, physical education, and recreational weekend social services are available.
