= Cayetano Santos Godino =

Argentine serial killer (1896–1944)

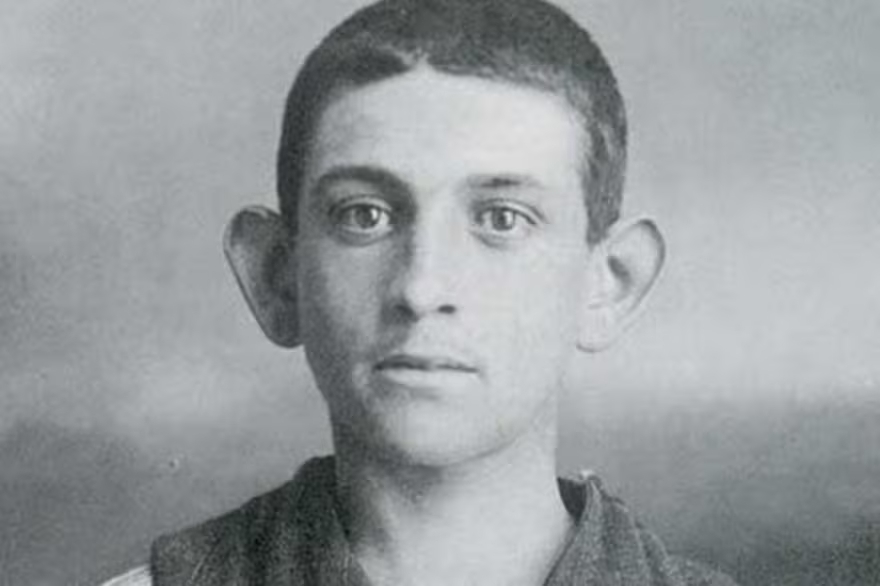
- mugshot of Godino shortly after his arrest (1912)
- Born: Cayetano Santos Godino; 31 October 1896; Buenos Aires, Argentina
- Died: 15 November 1944 (aged 48); Ushuaia, Tierra del Fuego Province, Argentina
- Motive: Unknown
- Penalty: Not guilty by reason of insanity, indefinite reclusion

Details
- Victims: 4
- Span of crimes: 29 March 1906 – 3 December 1912
- Country: Argentina
- Date apprehended: 4 December 1912

Cayetano Santos Godino (31 October 1896 – 15 November 1944), also known as El Petiso Orejudo ('the little big-eared one', or 'the big-eared short guy'), was an Argentine serial killer and arsonist who murdered four children, attempted to kill seven others, and set fire to seven buildings, psychologically enjoying fires.

Deemed insane by doctors, he was initially hospitalized in a psychiatric facility, but was quickly sent to prison after he attacked vulnerable and non-violent patients. In November 1944, Godino died at the Ushuaia Penitentiary in Ushuaia, Tierra del Fuego Province, presumably killed by other inmates who were angry at him for killing a pet cat.

== Early life ==
Cayetano Santos Godino was born in 1896 in Buenos Aires as one of ten siblings. His parents, Fiore Godino and Lucía Raffo, had emigrated from Calabria, Italy, in 1884 or 1888, with hopes of improving their lives in Argentina. Both Godino and Raffo suffered from severe alcoholism. The elder Godino contracted syphilis before Cayetano was born, which caused serious health problems during Cayetano's childhood. In the first years of his life, Godino experienced near death crises due to diarrhea and was also subjected to extreme physical violence and abuse by his father.

As Godino grew up under heavy violence, his older brother Antonio became an alcoholic, taking part in his father's beatings of Cayetano. As a consequence of the violence at home, Godino became a street kid, roaming Buenos Aires neighborhoods and barely attending school, being expelled from most of them due to his rebellious behavior and lack of academic interest. His first petty crimes occurred in rural and suburban areas in the neighborhoods of Almagro and Parque Patricios.

== First murder ==
Godino's behaviour worsened during childhood, when he began killing cats and small birds. His first offence against a person occurred on 28 September 1904, when Godino, then aged seven, took 2-year-old Miguel Depaola to a deserted lot and brutally beat him, throwing him on a plant of thorns. A passing police officer noticed the assault and took both boys to the local station, where their respective mothers fetched them later.

In 1905, Godino attacked 18-month-old Ana Neri, taking the girl to a secluded area, where he hit her in the head with a rock several times. As in the first case, a police officer witnessed the assault and rushed to help the girl, subsequently taking Godino to the police station. However, due to his age, he was released that same night.

On 29 March 1906, 9-year-old Godino committed his first murder. He lured María Rosa Face, a three-year-old girl, to a vacant lot where he brutally attacked her, strangling her with a ligature. Godino hastily buried Face alive and threw empty cans on her before escaping. Face's body was never found; when Godino was arrested, he confessed to the murder and took police to the vacant lot, where an apartment building had been built by 1912.

Two weeks after killing Face, Godino's father caught him strangling chickens from his farm. The man severely beat Godino before taking him to the police station, where officers accepted to arrest the boy. In a statement before the police chief, Godino's father also testified that he had found a box with dead birds under his son's bed. A judge ordered that Godino be taken to a reformatory, where he spent two months in detention. Upon release, he resumed street roaming and petty criminality.

== Increasing violence (1908–1912) ==
On 9 September 1908, at eleven years old, Godino lured 2-year-old Severino González Caló to a wine cellar near a Catholic school. Inside the cellar, Godino forced the boy into a drinking pool for horses and put a lid on top in an attempt to drown him. The owner of the cellar arrived in time and called the police. When questioned as to why he had done that, Godino denied taking González to the cellar and said that a woman clad in black was responsible for the attack. Godino spent the night at the police station and was released the following morning.

Six days after attempting to kill González, Godino viciously attacked 22-month-old Julio Botte, burning the boy's eyelids with a cigarette. Botte's mother witnessed the assault and tried to catch Godino, who escaped before the arrival of police. Meanwhile, Godino's parents, tired of his behaviour and other troubling issues like compulsive masturbation and violent impulsivity, decided to hand him over to police custody again. This time, Godino was taken to a juvenile reformatory in Marcos Paz, Buenos Aires, where he spent three years, learning to read and write in Spanish. He was discharged from the facility soon after his 14th birthday in December 1911, allegedly upon his parents' request, who asked him to go back to live with them. Godino's parents found a job at a factory for him, but due to his continuing erratic behaviour, he kept the job for only three months.

Towards the end of 1911, Godino began to drink heavily and roam the streets again, venturing far from home and experiencing headaches, later describing them as growing homicidal ideation.

== Serial murders (1912) ==
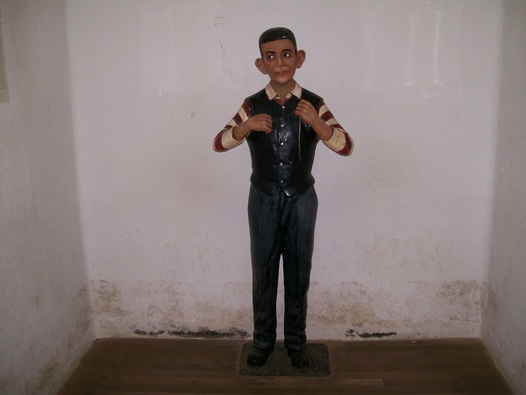
Godino's wax statue at the Ushuahia Penitentiary museum, where he spent most of life

On 17 January 1912, Godino broke into a cellar in the affluent Avenida Corrientes in Buenos Aires and set the building on fire, which took up to four hours for firefighters to extinguish. Godino recalled that he enjoyed watching firefighters work and fight the flames.

Days later, on 26 January, police found the body of Arturo Laurora, a 13-year-old boy who had been reported as missing the day before. Laurora's body was discovered inside an empty house which was up for rent; it was half-naked and had a ligature around the neck. Godino confessed to this murder after his arrest.

Godino committed his third murder on 7 March 1912, when he attacked five-year-old Reyna Bonita Vaínicoff, setting her dress on fire. The girl suffered serious burns and died sixteen days later at the Hospital Pedro de Elizalde.

Between Vaínicoff's murder, his subsequent attacks and final murder, Godino committed several arsons across Buenos Aires. He also killed a mare at a country house where he was working, repeatedly stabbing the animal with a knife. On 8 November 1912, Godino lured two-year-old Roberto Russo to an isolated area, where he tied the boy's feet and attempted to strangle him with a cord. A construction worker saw the crime and called the police, who arrested Godino and took him for questioning. He testified that he had found the boy with his hands tied and was trying to set him free. Police subsequently released him.

On 16 November, Godino assaulted and beat a three-year-old girl, who was saved by a man passing by. The man chased Godino away, who escaped again. On 20 November, he asked five-year-old Catalina Naulener to help him find an empty lot; when the girl refused to go with him, Godino got angry and brutally assaulted her. She was saved by a neighbour who heard her screaming. Godino, once again, managed to escape before police arrived to the scene.

Godino's last murder occurred on 3 December 1912, a year after his parents withdrew him from his juvenile reformatory, when he lured three-year-old Gesualdo Giordano to an abandoned country house under the promise of giving him sweets and chocolates. In the abandoned building (today the Bernasconi Institute), Godino brutally assaulted the boy, who fiercely resisted Godino's attempts to strangle him with a ligature. Godino subsequently tied the boy's hands and feet and went outside for something to kill the child. He encountered Giordano's father, who asked him if he had seen his son. Godino replied that he had not seen Gesualdo and advised the man to search in nearby areas. When the boy's father departed, Godino returned to the house and murdered the agonising boy by introducing a 10 centimetres (3.9 in) nail into one of the boy's temples. After killing the child, Godino covered the body and escaped.

The body of Gesualdo Giordano was quickly found, with his funeral taking place that same night. Godino attended the funeral and left crying after seeing that the nail had been removed from the boy's temple. Two investigators in attendance at the funeral suspected of Godino and linked the other cases to him. Police raided Godino's home in the early hours of 4 December 1912, arresting him for murder.

== Legal proceedings ==
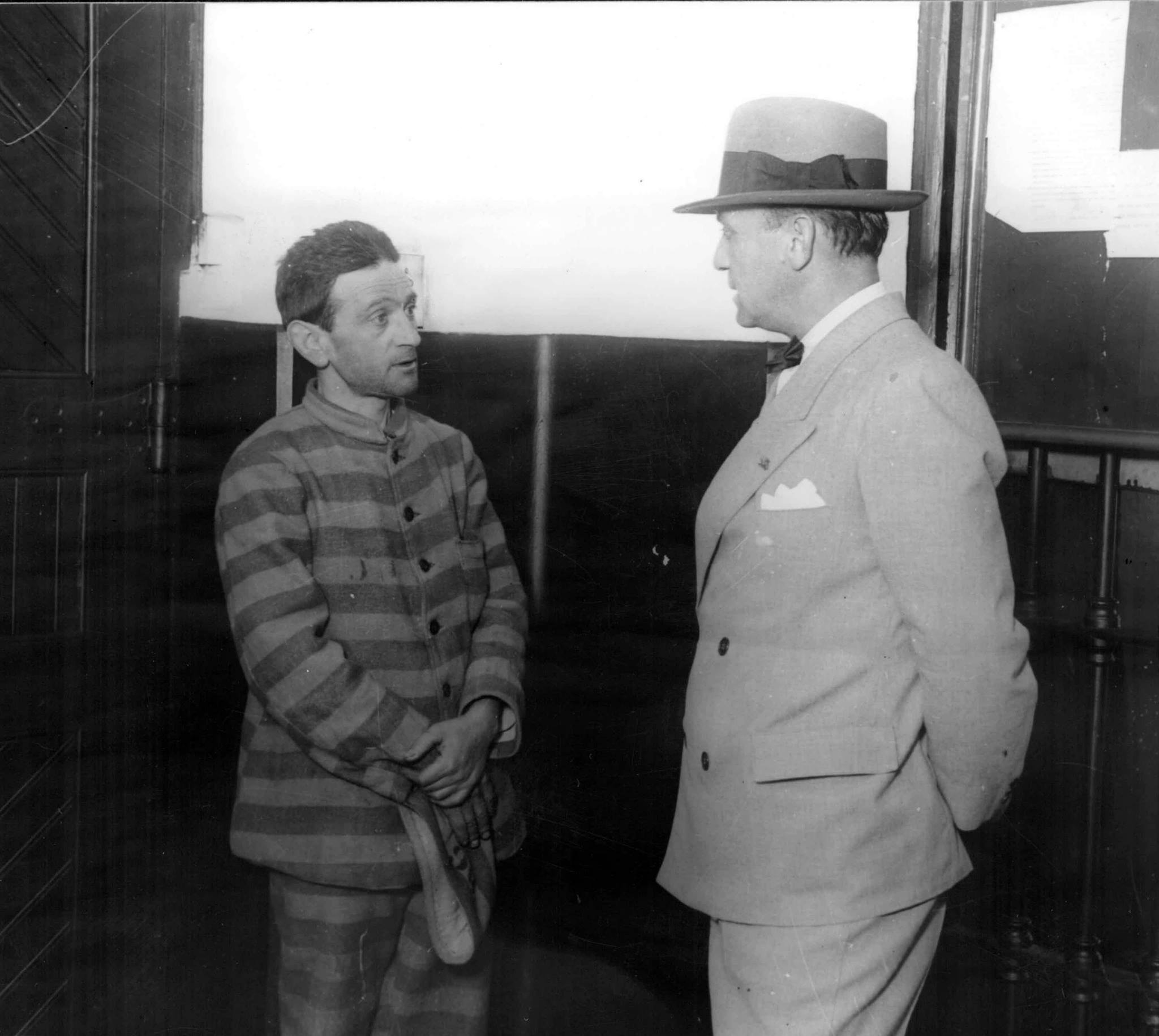
Godino in later life talking with an investigator at the Ushuaia Penitentiary

After his arrest, Godino confessed to four murders and many other murder attempts. When interviewed by doctors, he stated that he did not understand what "remorse" meant and that he had enjoyed killing children. Godino was not tried in court for his crimes, with judge Ramos Mejía ruling that he was unfit to stand trial. The judge found him not guilty by reason of insanity and ordered his commitment to a secure facility for an indeterminate time. Godino was first housed at the Hospital Borda, where he attacked two vulnerable patients: one of them bedridden and the other on a wheelchair.

After these attacks and to protect the patients at the mental hospital, the Court of Appeals in San Isidro unanimously decided to send Godino to prison. His first stay in prison was at the Penitenciaría Nacional in Buenos Aires, where he remained until 1923. He was subsequently sent to a remote prison in Ushuaia, in the southernmost Tierra del Fuego province, known as "the prison at the end of the world" (Spanish: La carcel del fin del mundo).

Some doctors in Ushuaia, influenced by the anthropological social Darwinistic theory of Italian criminologist Cesare Lombroso, thought that Godino's big ears were the root cause of his evil. In 1927, he was subjected to a surgery to shrink his ears, which showed no sign of change in Godino's behaviour.

Godino requested parole in 1936, but it was denied by doctors who found him to be "perverse, degenerate, and dangerous."

== Incarceration and death ==
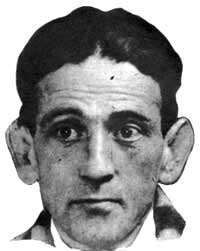
Godino's mugshot at the Ushuaia Pentinentiary

Little is known about the years that Godino spent in prison. In 1933, he was assaulted by other inmates for killing a pet cat by throwing the animal into a burning oven. As a result, Godino spent twenty days in the prison's hospital. He never received visits nor letters, and never showed any remorse for his crimes.

On 15 November 1944, Godino died from an apparent peptic ulcer disease which was later attributed to frequent attacks by other inmates, as well as rape and sexual assaults. According to prison guards at the time, he was killed by enraged cellmates after Godino killed their pet cat.

The Ushuaia Penitentiary was closed in 1947 and his remains were never found, with some prison guards testifying that after his death, his body was put into a barrel and thrown to the sea.

== Legacy and analysis ==
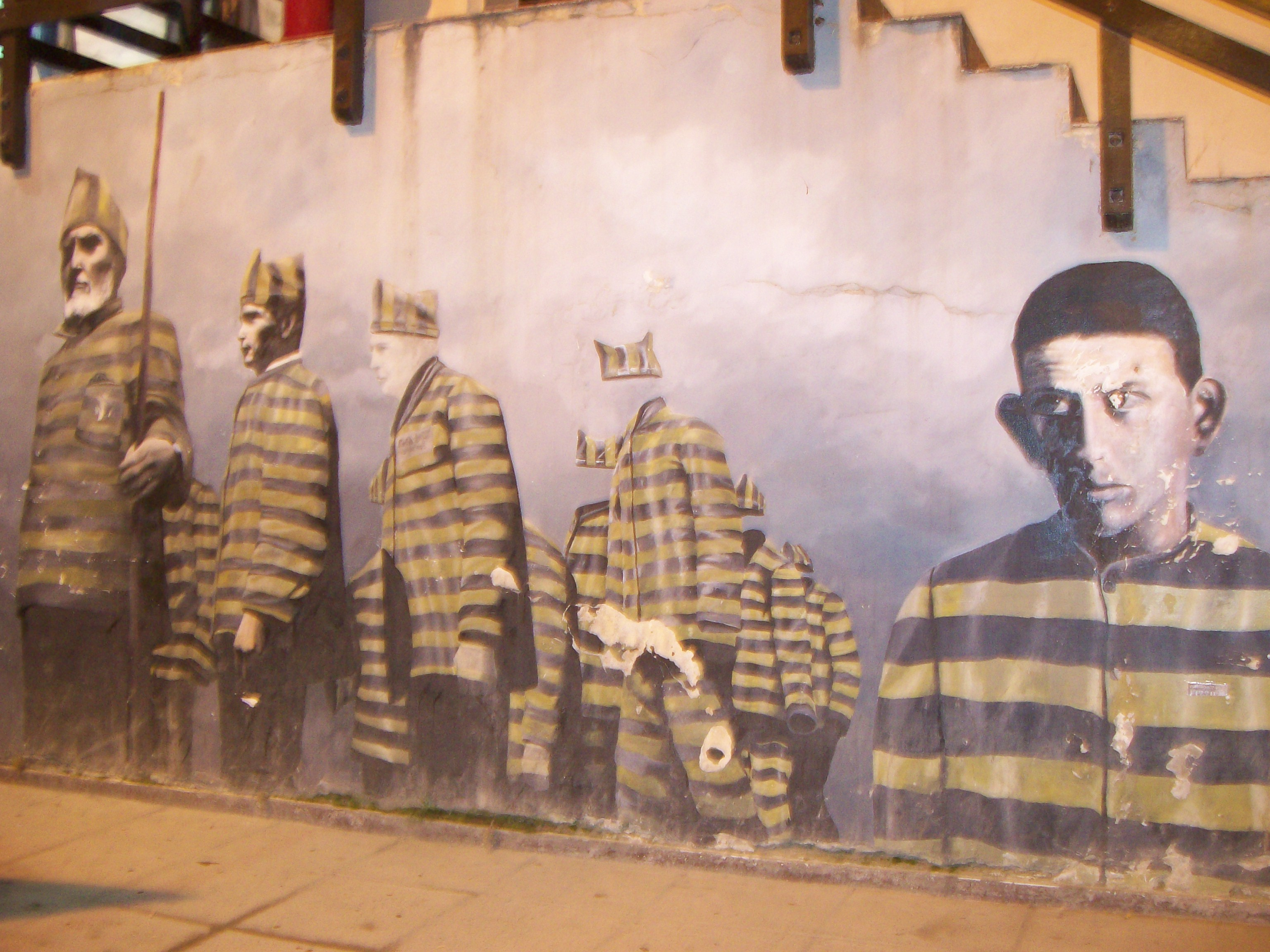
A painting on a wall depicting Godino at the Ushuaia Penitentiary museum

María Moreno, who wrote a book about Godino's case, analyses the case with the cultural context of those times in Argentina. The crimes caused a moral panic among affluent citizens, who saw Godino as an example of ignorance and danger from the new wave of immigrants that Argentina saw in the end of the 19th-century and early 20th-century. The murders, according to Guillermo Monti, occurred amid social tensions in Argentina, where the upper classes were alarmed at the growing anarchist violence which ultimately ended in the Tragic Week of 1919.

Godino is sometimes described as Argentina's first serial killer, but Cayetano Domingo Grossi (who killed five of his own infant children) was executed in 1900, six years before Godino committed his first murder.

Argentine journalist Rodrigo Palacios says that there are not many comparisons in Argentine criminal history, showing several differences to the crimes committed by Robledo Puch, another Argentine serial killer who was active in the early 1970s.

Palacios considers Godino a dysfunctional criminal, adding that the beatings his father gave him and the influence of one of his brothers, who provided him with alcohol, deeply damaged young Godino. His father's violence was so frequent that Godino used to escape from home and sleep elsewhere.

Godino has been a part of Argentine folk culture, with Palacios saying that families have used his nickname to scare unruly children and make them sleep, comparing Godino with the bogeyman. In Ushuaia, there is a museum on the premises of the old Ushuaia Penitentiary, where Godino died. Among information and historical pictures, there is a wax statue resembling Godino.

== Victims ==
=== Murdered ===
Details
Name	Age	Date	Notes
María Rosa Face	3	29 March 1906	Godino took the girl to a vacant lot, where he strangled her with a ligature before burying her alive, throwing empty cans and bottles on her. The girl's remains were never found
Arturo Laurora	13	26 January 1912	Godino strangled the boy with a ligature and partially undressed the body
Reyna Bonita Vaínicoff	5	7 March 1912	Godino set fire to the girl's dress, who succumbed to her burn injuries two weeks later
Gesualdo Giordano	3	3 December 1912	Godino took the boy to an abandoned country house and attempted to kill the boy by strangling him with a ligature. When the boy resisted, Godino took a rock and a 10 centimetres (3.9 in) nail and inserted the nail into one of the boy's temples, killing him

=== Attempted murders ===
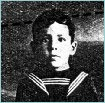
In 1908, Godino attempted to drown Severino González Caló (pictured) in a cellar

Details
Name	Age	Date	Notes
Miguel Depaola	2	28 September 1904	Depaola was the first victim of Godino's violence. Godino beat the boy and threw him on a plant with thorns
Ana Neri	18 months old	1905	Godino took the toddler to a vacant lot and hit her repeatedly in the head with a rock. A passing police officer intervened and saved the girl
Severino González Caló	2	9 September 1908	González was the first victim after Godino's first murder in 1906. Godino took González to a cellar and attempted to drown him in a drinking pool for horses before a man saved the boy
Julio Botte	22 months old	15 September 1908	Godino attacked the toddler by burning his eyelids with a cigarette. When the boy's mother tried to catch Godino, he escaped
Roberto Russo	2	8 November 1912	After taking Russo to vacant lot, Godino attempted to strangle him with a ligature. A construction worker saw them and called the police. Godino told police that he was trying to save Russo after finding him with the cord around his neck
Catalina Neutelier	5	20 November 1912	When the girl, afraid of Godino, refused to go with him to a vacant lot, he viciously assaulted her. A neighbour who heard the girl screaming, shouted at Godino, who quickly fled

== See also ==
- Mary Bell
- Murder of James Bulger
- List of serial killers by country#Argentina

== Bibliography ==
- Contreras, Leonel (2003). Leyenda Del Petiso Orejudo [The Legend of the Big-Eared Midget] (in Spanish). Ediciones Turisticas. ISBN 987-9473-27-2.
- Moreno, María (2021). El Petiso Orejudo [The Big-Eared Midget] (in Spanish). Grupo Planeta.
