= Hospital Provincial de Rosario =

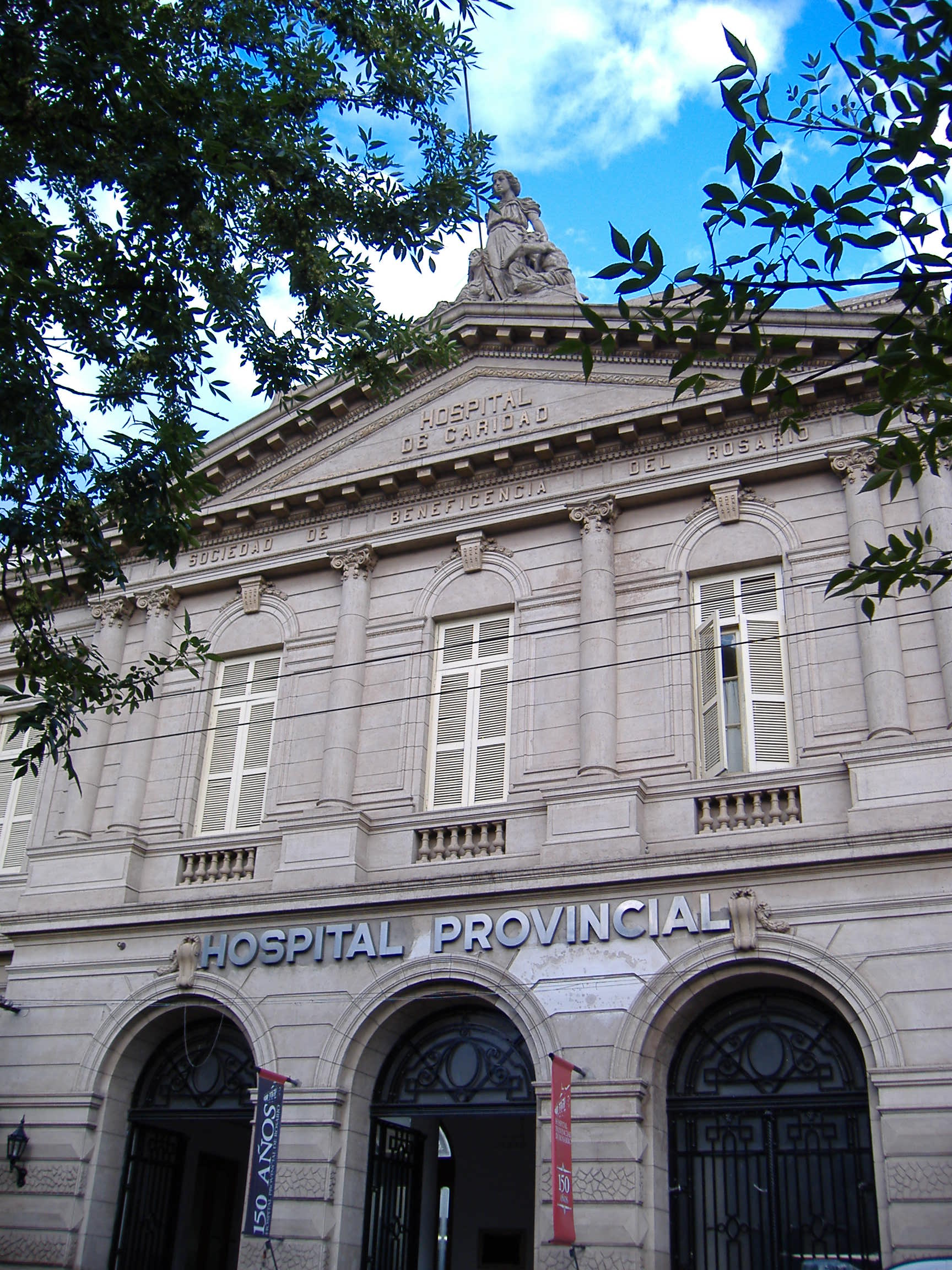
- The upper facade of the HPR, on 1450 Alem St.

Geography
- Location: 1450 Leandro N. Alem, Rosario, Santa Fe Province, Argentina
- Coordinates: 32°57′22″S 60°37′51″W

Organisation
- Type: General
- Affiliated university: National University of Rosario

History
- Former name: Hospital de Caridad
- Opened: 4 October 1855; 170 years ago

Links
- Lists: Hospitals in Argentina

The Hospital Provincial de Rosario (HPR; transl. "Provincial Hospital of Rosario") is a general hospital in Rosario, Argentina, which depends on the Health Ministry of the provincial state of Santa Fe. It is a public hospital (managed partly by an elected council) and serves as the base hospital for Programmatic Area III of Zone VIII of the Santa Fe Ministry of Health.

== History ==
The HPR was the first hospital in Rosario and the first in the south of Santa Fe. It was inaugurated on 4 October 1855, with the name Hospital de Caridad ("Charity Hospital"), by the Sociedad de Beneficencia de Rosario ("Charitable Society of Rosario"). At the time of its foundation, the hospital was outside the main populated area of the then-small village of Rosario (which had little over 3,000 inhabitants).

Presently the HPR is located in the center of the city (taking up a whole block) and serves an area with a population estimate of 386,000 residents, treating 182,000 people a year, admitting 25 patients a day, and performing 300 surgeries per month. The hospital also manages 16 primary care centers distributed in the southern part of Rosario.
