= Hospital Italiano de Buenos Aires =

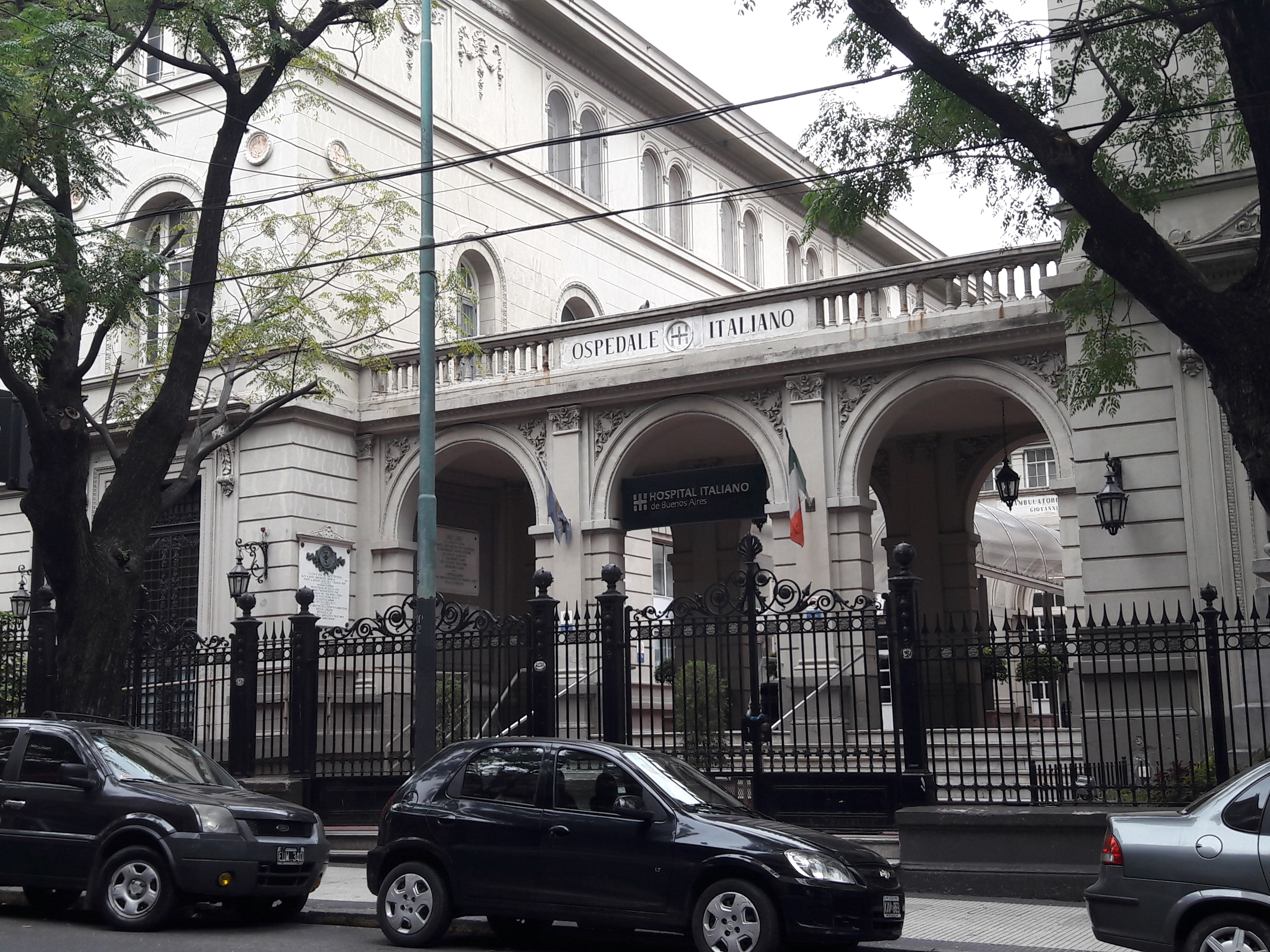
- Main building of the Hospital.

Geography
- Location: Buenos Aires (Note: Main hospital); Greater Buenos Aires (Note: The Hospital Italiano "Agustín Rocca" of San Justo.), Argentina
- Coordinates: 34°36′23.7″S 58°25′30″W

Organisation
- Care system: Private
- Type: Specialist

Services
- Beds: 750

History
- Founded: 1872; 154 years ago

Links
- Website: http://www.hospitalitaliano.org.ar/
- Lists: Hospitals in Argentina

The Hospital Italiano de Buenos Aires is a private hospital in Buenos Aires, capital of Argentina. It has 750 beds and serves around 2,000 inpatients per month. It has 23 medical centers distributed across the Buenos Aires Metropolitan Area. Its main facilities cover a surface area of 78,000 m^{2} (850,000 ft^{2}). The hospital treats both private patients and those derived by social security. It also provides its own health insurance plan, being the most important pre-paid healthcare service in Argentina, with about 150,000 clients.

== The first hospital ==
Hospital Italiano de Buenos Aires shortly after its construction.

The hospital was originally an initiative of a commission formed by distinguished members of the numerous Italian immigrant community of the city. Its foundation stone was laid on March 12, 1854, on a tract of land donated by a priest, Father José Arata. Count Giovanni Battista Albini of Sardinia contributed in the name of King Vittorio Emanuele I with the sum of 45,000 pesos. The construction was nevertheless delayed due to lack of funding, until in 1858 it was resumed by the association Unione e Benevolenza.

The hospital was almost finished in 1865, when the national government asked that it be set aside to treat wounded Brazilian soldiers of the Paraguayan War. In 1867 the works were resumed, only to be stopped once again by an epidemic of cholera, which prompted the government of the city of Buenos Aires to requisition its services until 1869. It was employed to treat soldiers again until the end of the war in 1870, and then in 1871 to house yellow fever patients. The hospital was finally inaugurated on December 8, 1872.

== The second hospital ==
The management of the hospital struck agreements with philanthropic associations for the attention of other immigrants besides the Italian community, and in time the facilities proved too small. A campaign was started to obtain funds from the public in order to expand them. In 1888 the government of Buenos Aires asked for it to be moved.

On December 15, 1889, the foundation stone of the new Hospital Italiano was laid, on a city block delimited by Gascón, Potosí, Palestina and Perón streets, in the borough of Almagro. The ceremony was attended by Elisa F. de Juárez Celman, wife of then-President Miguel Juárez Celman, and a representative of King Umberto I of Italy; the new building was inaugurated on December 21, 1901. In 1903 the Nursing School was installed, and in 1905 the hospital additionally became a medicine and surgery school.

A new building (the Policlínico) was inaugurated on September 20, 1913.

== Notable patients who have been in the hospital ==
- Antonio di Benedetto, died in 1986.
- José Pampuro, died in 2021.
- Silvina Luna, died in 2023.
- Juan José Sebreli, died in 2024.
- Jorge Lanata, died in 2024.
- Marcelo Araujo, died in 2026.

== See also ==
- List of hospitals in Argentina
- Healthcare in Argentina
