= Hospital Garrahan =

Hospital de Pediatría S.A.M.I.C. "Prof. Dr. Juan P. Garrahan"
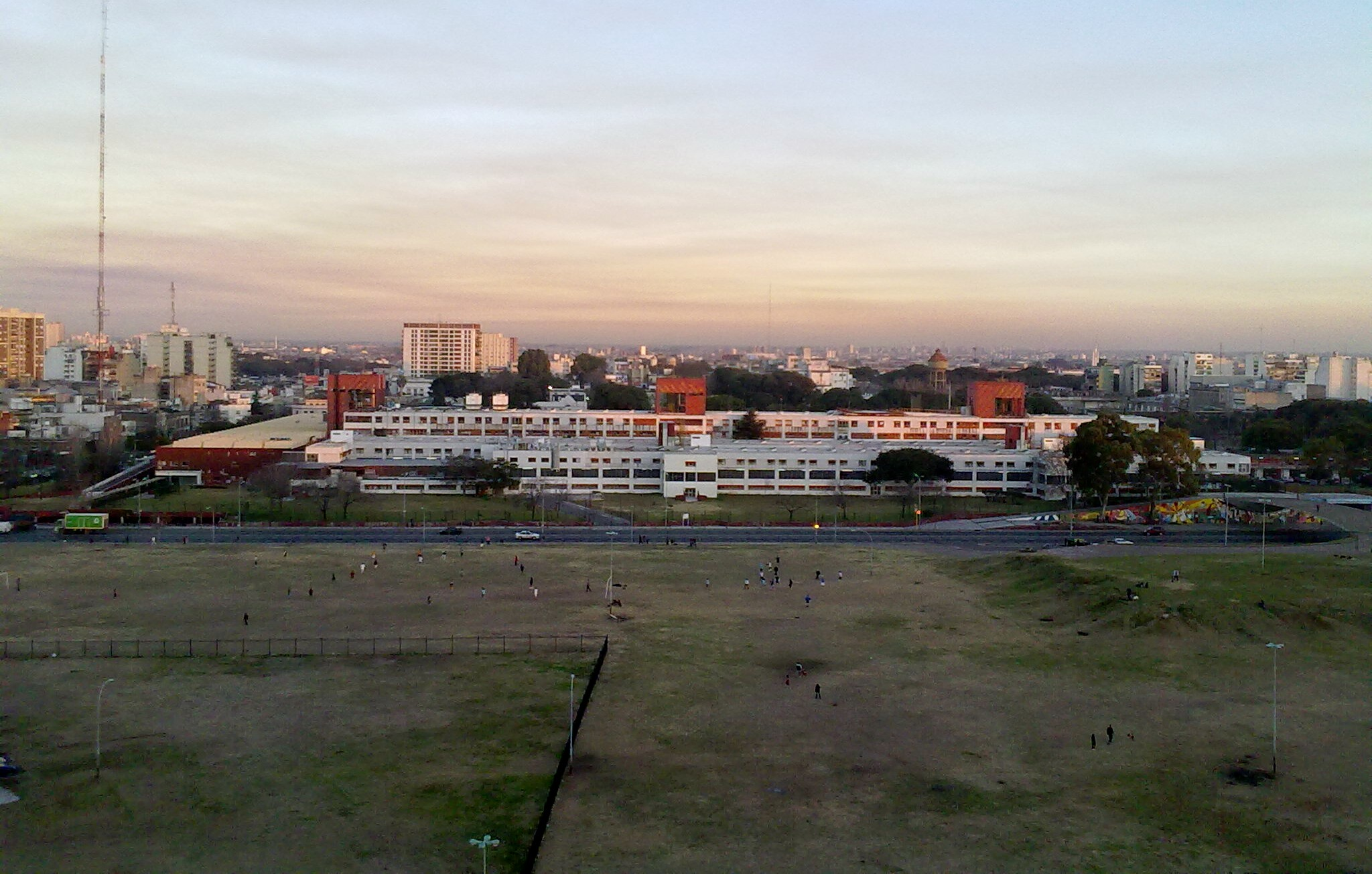

Geography
- Location: Buenos Aires, Argentina
- Coordinates: 34°37′51″S 58°23′36″W

Organisation
- Type: Specialist

Services
- Beds: 513 inpatient, 130 intensive care
- Speciality: Pediatrics

History
- Founded: 1987; 39 years ago

Links
- Website: www.garrahan.gov.ar
- Lists: Hospitals in Argentina

Hospital de Pediatría S.A.M.I.C. "Prof. Dr. Juan P. Garrahan", commonly known as Hospital Garrahan, is a public hospital in Buenos Aires, Argentina, located in the neighborhood of Parque Patricios. Since it opened on 25 August 1987, it has become the leading public, free and high-complexity pediatric hospital in the country.

It is a highly specialized medical center, with over 3000 employees, state-of-the-art technology and progressive cares. It is jointly funded by the federal government of Argentina (80%) and by the Buenos Aires City Government (20%).

Federal funding, however, has been frozen since 2024, which has ignited a conflict between the government and the hospital staff.
