= Hospital Udaondo =

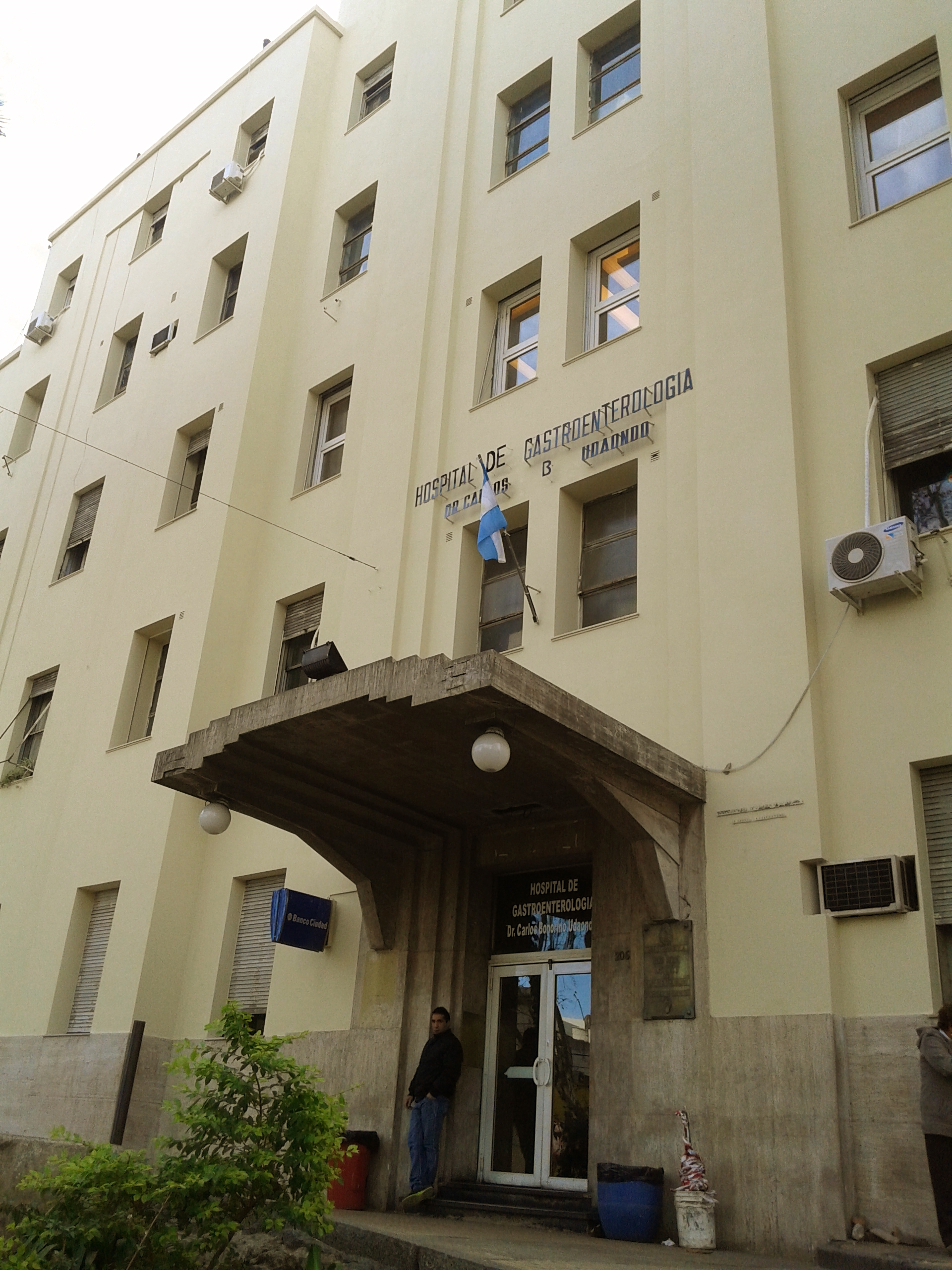
- Hospital Udanondo

Geography
- Location: Buenos Aires, Argentina
- Coordinates: 34.6340°S 58.3916°W

Organisation
- Type: Specialist

Services
- Speciality: Gastroenterology

History
- Former name: National Dispensary for Diseases of the Digestive System
- Opened: August 1, 1938

Links
- Lists: Hospitals in Argentina

Hospital Udaondo is a hospital in Buenos Aires, Argentina.

== History ==
The origin of the current hospital dates back to 1938, when Dr. Carlos Bonorino Udaondo promoted the creation of an hospital that specializes in gastroenterology. With the support of the Argentine National Executive Power, on August 1 the National Dispensary for Diseases of the Digestive System was created. Designed by the Advisory Committee on Asylums and Regional Hospitals, its first headquarters was a small hotel on Calle Tucumán 1978, in Buenos Aires.

Udaondo had been holder of the chair of semiology at the Faculty of Medicine of the University of Buenos Aires, where he had arrived as Dean, and since 1933 he served as Counselor in that field. For this reason, he managed to gather other specialists, such as doctors Sanguinetti, Ramos Mejía, Portela, López García, Centeno, Pinedo, Cerviño, Perrazo and Ricchieri. In 1939, new land was acquired to expand the hospital, but soon they were sold to different businessmen by Mayor Arturo Goyeneche for less than a tenth of their value, for which reason the environment of President Ortiz and different politicians from the Buenos Aires Radical Civic Union.

With the passage of time, the Dispensary grew and began to be equipped with advanced equipment, but it lacked the space necessary for surgical interventions, which had to be referred to the Rawson Hospital or Rivadavia. For this reason, in 1947 and by Decree of the Executive Power, it was elevated to the rank of Institute of Gastroenterology, and a building was transferred to it in Avenida Caseros 2061, which belonged to the officers' area of the Central Military Hospital and would have the space and materials necessary to complete the needs of the establishment.

Udaondo was appointed Director of the Institute, a position he held until the following year, when he was promoted to National Director of Gastroenterology, a role he played until his death in 1951. At that time the Ministry of Public Health imposed his name on the Institute that he had promoted and directed.

In the late 1950s, under the direction of Dr. Manuel Ramos Mejía, a system of scholarships with accommodation in hospitals begins to be implemented for professionals from the provinces who need training in both gastroenterology and surgery. This would be the beginning of future medical residences. In 1954, the opening of 25 beds was given and Hall A was expanded, with the aim of starting a new care area, adding 1,800 m2 to the building, the prestige gained, the significant number of patients and the need to provide it with a surgeon determined that in 1947, by decree of the National Executive Power, it was elevated to the category of Institute of Gastroenterology. The new building corresponded to pavilion A of the Central Hospital for Tuberculosis patients and previously to the Military Hospital (area dedicated to the officers). When Dr. Manuel Casal began his task, everything was about to be done, his tenacious effort of the young years, took him from the task of moving the hospitalized tuberculosis patients, to conditioning the multiple details for their operation. In 1948 Dr. Manuel Casal was appointed Director of the Establishment while Dr. Carlos Bonorino Udaondo was designated National Director of Gastroenterology. This designation aimed at the realization of an ambitious plan: all the activity is concentrated in the Caseros street building, and Dr. Manuel Casal manages to organize the external consulting rooms on the ground floor, the hospitalizations on the 1st. and 2nd. floor, while in the 3rd the operating rooms are enabled. The surgical activity is prestigious with the presence of Dr. Soupoult from Paris. It took him from the task of moving hospitalized tuberculosis patients, to conditioning the multiple details for their operation. In 1948 Dr. Manuel Casal was appointed Director of the Establishment while Dr. Carlos Bonorino Udaondo was designated National Director of Gastroenterology. This designation aimed at the realization of an ambitious plan: all the activity is concentrated in the Caseros street building, and Dr. Manuel Casal manages to organize the external consulting rooms on the ground floor, the hospitalizations on the 1st. and 2nd. floor, while in the 3rd the operating rooms are enabled. The surgical activity is prestigious with the presence of Dr. Soupoult from Paris. It took him from the task of moving hospitalized tuberculosis patients, to conditioning the multiple details for their operation. In 1948 Dr. Manuel Casal was appointed Director of the Establishment while Dr. Carlos Bonorino Udaondo was designated National Director of Gastroenterology. This designation aimed at the realization of an ambitious plan: all the activity is concentrated in the Caseros street building, and Dr. Manuel Casal manages to organize the external consulting rooms on the ground floor, the hospitalizations on the 1st. and 2nd. floor, while in the 3rd the operating rooms are enabled. The surgical activity is prestigious with the presence of Dr. Soupoult from Paris. Manuel Casal is appointed Director of the Establishment while Dr. Carlos Bonorino Udaondo was designated National Director of Gastroenterology. This designation aimed at the realization of an ambitious plan: all the activity is concentrated in the Caseros street building, and Dr. Manuel Casal manages to organize the external consulting rooms on the ground floor, the hospitalizations on the 1st. and 2nd. floor, while in the 3rd the operating rooms are enabled. The surgical activity is prestigious with the presence of Dr. Soupoult from Paris. Manuel Casal is appointed Director of the Establishment while Dr. Carlos Bonorino Udaondo was designated National Director of Gastroenterology. This designation aimed at the realization of an ambitious plan: all the activity is concentrated in the Caseros street building, and Dr. Manuel Casal manages to organize the external consulting rooms on the ground floor, the hospitalizations on the 1st. and 2nd. floor, while in the 3rd the operating rooms are enabled. The surgical activity is prestigious with the presence of Dr. Soupoult from Paris. Manuel Casal manages to organize the external consulting rooms on the ground floor, the hospitalizations on the 1st. and 2nd. floor, while in the 3rd the operating rooms are enabled. The surgical activity is prestigious with the presence of Dr. Soupoult from Paris. Manuel Casal manages to organize the external consulting rooms on the ground floor, the hospitalizations on the 1st. and 2nd. floor, while in the 3rd the operating rooms are enabled. The surgical activity is prestigious with the presence of Dr. Soupoult from Paris.

In 1982, under the direction of the director, Dr. Alfonso Fraise, the Udaondo Hospital added a new building.

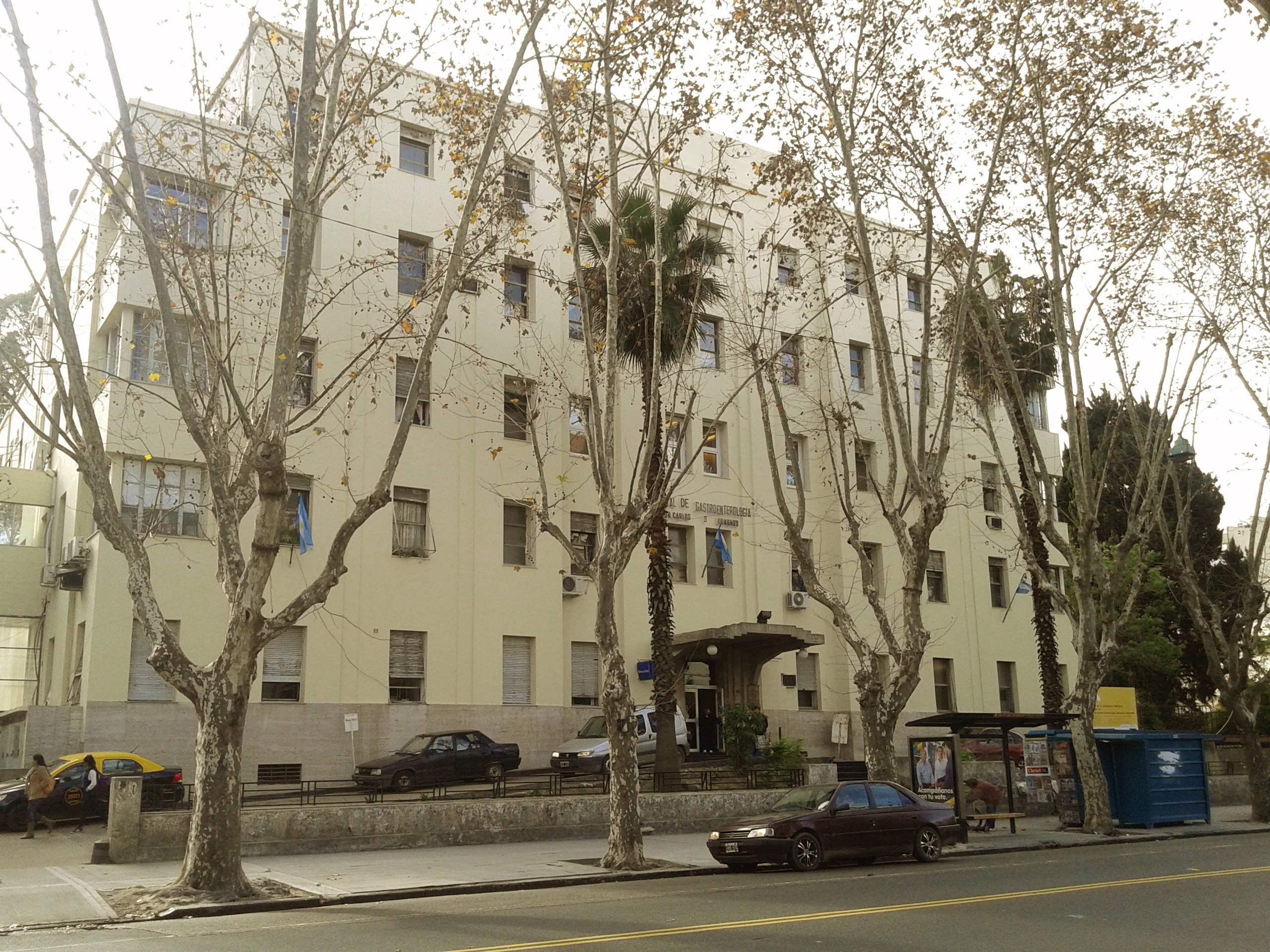
Hospital front on Avenida Caseros

In 1992, by Resolution 1,362 / 1992, the Ministry of Health and Social Development delegated the administration of Udaondo from the federal level to that of the Municipality of the City of Buenos Aires. Both in the areas of health and education, the National Government would transfer the management of the establishments to the provinces and to the City of Buenos Aires during the presidency of Carlos Menem.

In August 2010, the Head of Government Mauricio Macri announced the project to close the Udaondo and María Ferrer hospitals, with the intention of transferring them to the Muñiz Hospital and creating the South Hospital Complex. The measure was rejected by workers and political sectors opposed to Macri's.

As of 2017, a lack of instruments to be able to intervene surgically and rusty elements that prevent sterilizations are reported. The hospital also suffers from a lack of supplies, a lack of medicines and nursing personnel, and a lack of transparency in the appointment of employees.
