= Hospital Domingo Funes =

Coordinates: 31.297°S 64.455°W

Domingo Funes Hospital

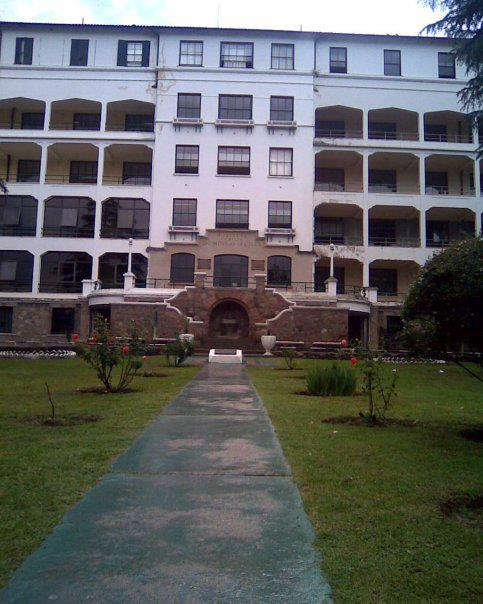

Geography
- Location: Villa Caeiro, Santa Maria de Punilla, Córdoba, Argentina

Organisation
- Care system: Public
- Type: Academic
- Affiliated university: National University of Cordoba

Services
- Beds: 167

History
- Founded: 1939

Links
- Lists: Hospitals in Argentina

The Domingo Funes Hospital is a provincial public health facility located 50 km northwest from the city of Cordoba, in the town of Villa Caeiro, Department Punilla, Córdoba Province, Argentina.

== History ==
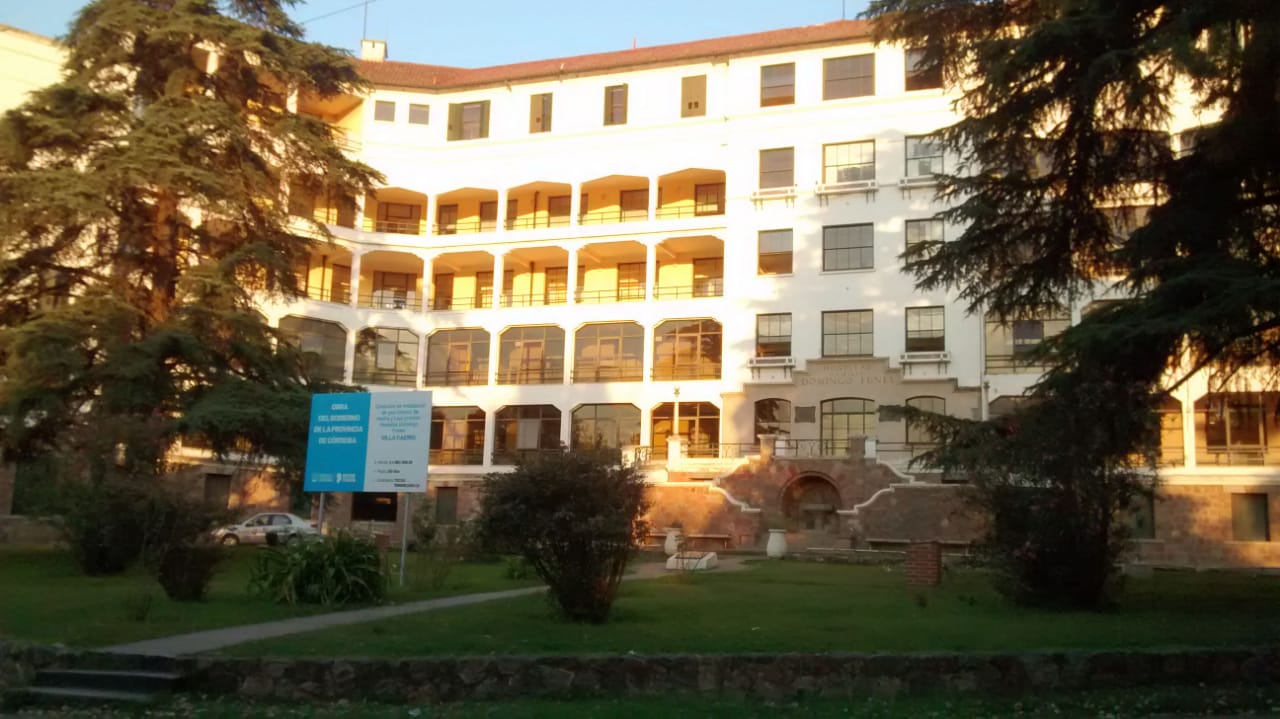
Hospital Domingo Funes

The hospital is named after a resolution given by the executor of the estate of Susana Funes de Pizarro Lastra, a philanthropist who made a large donation to build a tuberculosis female establishment, provided that it bears her name. Her executor, the notary Jacinto Fernandez, however determined to name it after her father, Domingo Funes. Since its creation in 1939, the institution went through several periods, from being a national tuberculosis hospital, is now a provincial multispecialty and academic institution.

== Healthcare ==
Regional referral center, level II, the hospital serves as a trauma center for the Punilla Valley and through the Provincial Referral System it covers medical emergencies within a 100 km radius. It features on call physicians in-house 24 hours a day, 7 days a week, in the specialties of Family Medicine, Internal Medicine, Intensive Care, Pediatrics, Neonatology, Obstetrics and Gynaecology, Hemotherapy, General Surgery, Anesthesiology and Orthopedic Surgery aided by the Nursing, Laboratory and Radiology services.

== Teaching hospital ==
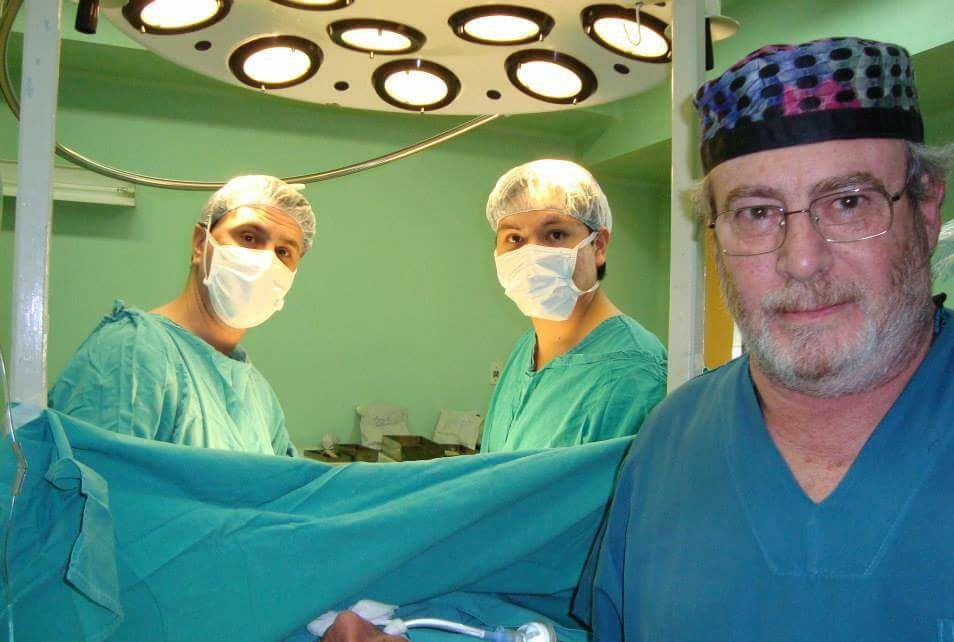
Surgical Training

It is a medical training center recognized by the Secretary of Graduates in Health Sciences, Faculty of Medical Sciences of the National University of Cordoba and the Health Care Providers Training School of the Ministry of Health of the province of Cordoba, which trains medical graduates through the provincial and national system of medical residencies in the programs of family medicine, internal medicine, intensive care, pediatrics, obstetrics and gynecology and general surgery. Its academic activity extends also to physicians in search of a post-graduate preliminary year of training in the areas of internal medicine and general surgery and to senior medical students in their final mandatory practice year, as well as students majoring in nursing, nutrition, physiotherapy, biochemistry and pharmacy. On April 23, 2012, the School of Nursing of the National University of Cordoba opened classrooms for 240 students inside the hospital.
