= Emilio Burgwardt Hospital =

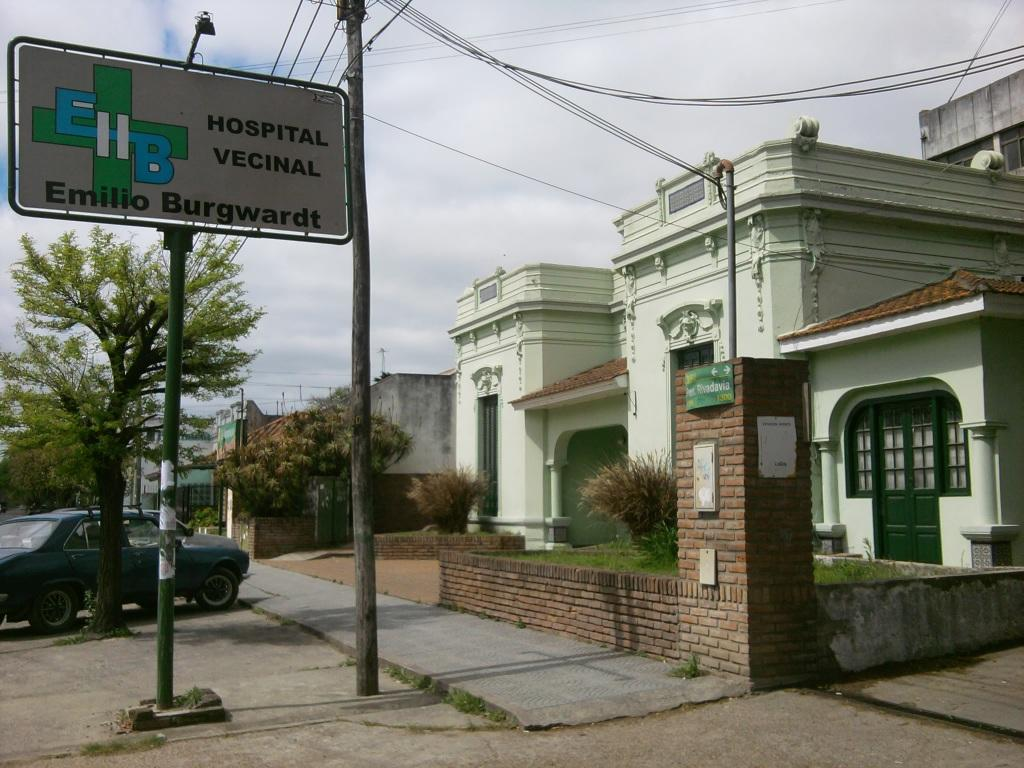

Geography
- Location: Longchamps, Buenos Aires, Argentina
- Coordinates: 34°51′26.111″S 58°23′11.778″W

History
- Opened: 1956

Links
- Lists: Hospitals in Argentina

The Emilio Burgwardt Hospital (Spanish: Hospital Vecinal Emilio Burgwardt, lit. 'Emilio Burgwardt Neighborhood Hospital') is a hospital located in Longchamps, in the southern area of the Greater Buenos Aires.

It is administered and owned by a civic society, Sociedad de Fomento Emilio Burgwardt.

It has five plants, an operating theater, hospitalization beds and a medical guard. However, building infrastructure has deteriorated over the years, leading to several claims for it to be administered by the Province of Buenos Aires Ministry of Health.

In 2020, amid the COVID-19 pandemic, Argentina's federal government performed a series of reforms in the hospital, aiming to reinforce the regional health system.

== History ==
The hospital opened in 1956 as a smaller institution, created by citizens' initiative of a group of neighbors, which growth it from a small community health center to a full hospital. It was built upon a house which used to belong to the Lezcano family of that city. It soon became a reference medical center in the region, since it featured an operation theater, beds, and a permanent medical guard.

In 2001, a mobile phone antenna was installed in the hospital rooftop.

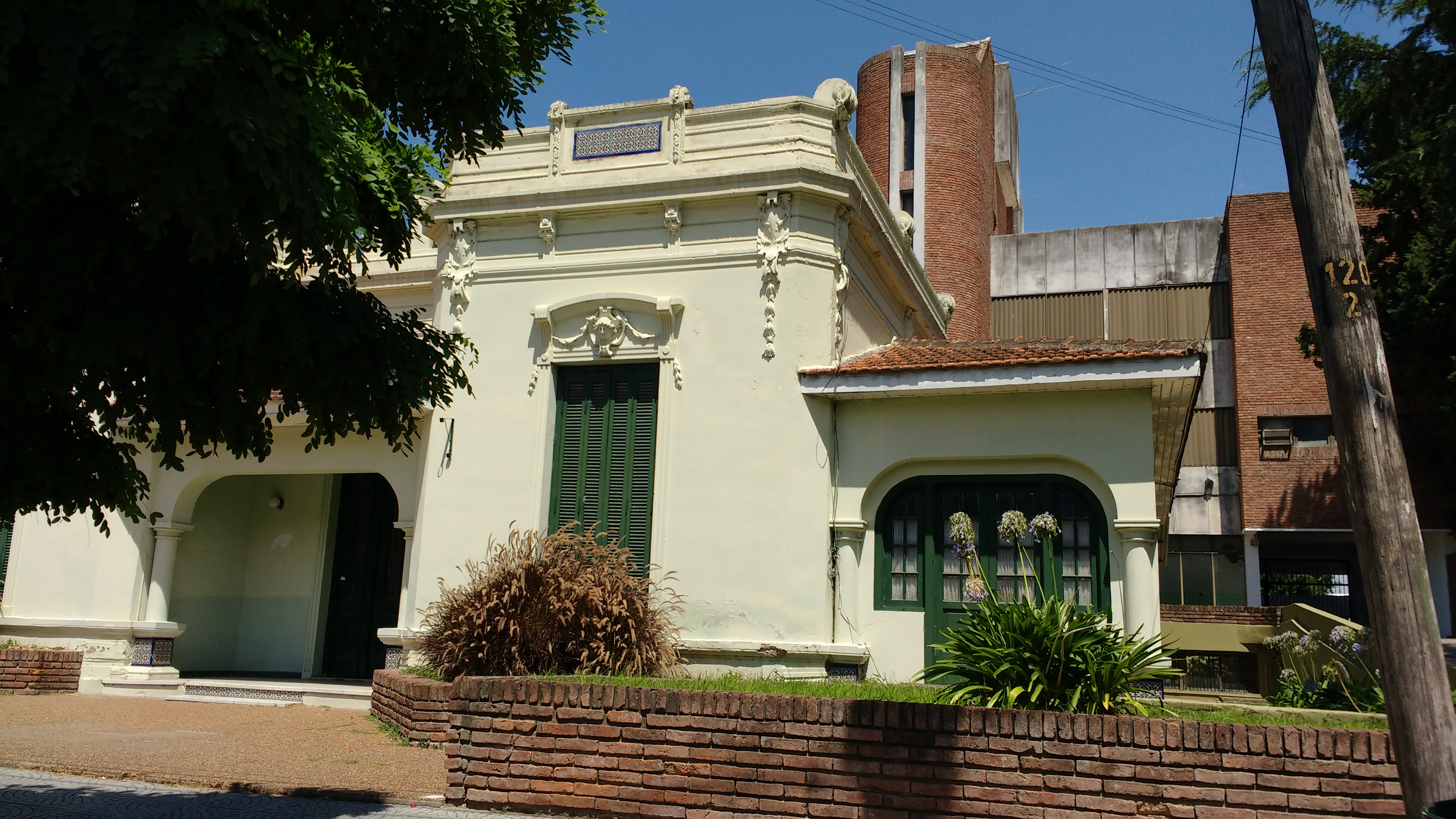
The hospital in 2016

In 2002, a 2-year-old boy named Fabricio Barrios died an hour after he was administered the MMR and Hepatitis B vaccines in the hospital. He couldn't be transferred to another hospital since there were no ambulances. His mother blamed the death on the Burgwardt Hospital, but according to the Buenos Aires Province Ministry of Health, the vaccines hadn't expired. That same day, other 25 children were vaccinated and had no issues. Then-Ministry of Health, Ginés González García, believed the death was caused by malpractice, arguing the boy had probably been injected with something other than the actual vaccine. Then-President of the Argentine Society of Pediatricians also didn't believe the vaccine could have caused the death.

The hospital administrator of the time, Ángel Marrone, stated that the hospital didn't receive any government funds and that, when they heard of this boy's case, immediately requested ambulances from the Lomas de Zamora 6th Sanitary Region, the Lucio Meléndez Hospital, and from a private ambulance company. The request was unanswered.

As years passed, the building situation deteriorated, and provided services cut down. By 2014, the hospital was practically inactive and only the offices, rented to third party physicians, were operating.

In 2014, the hospital was requested to dismantle the cell site, but then-administrator Norberto Paniagua refused to do so. The antenna was taken down on 2015, as neighbors had collected 1500 signatures demanding it.

In 2020, amid the COVID-19 pandemic, Argentina's federal government stroke a deal with the civic society which runs the hospital to make a series of reforms, aiming to reinforce the regional health system.
