= Cayetano Domingo Grossi =

Argentinian serial killer

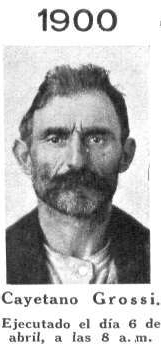
- Image published in a note of the weekly Caras y Caretas of April 14, 1900
- Born: 1854; Bonifati, Italy
- Died: April 6, 1900 (aged 46); Buenos Aires, Argentina
- Cause of death: Execution by firing squad
- Other name: "The Man of the Bag"
- Status: Executed
- Conviction: Murder
- Penalty: Death

Details
- Victims: 5
- Span of crimes: 1896–1898
- Country: Argentina

Cayetano Domingo Grossi (1854 – April 6, 1900) was the first known serial killer in Argentinian history. He murdered five of his own neonatal children that were conceived due to his rape of his two stepdaughters. He was sentenced to death and executed by firing squad on April 6, 1900.

== History ==
On May 29, 1896, a bag containing the arm of a baby was found at a waste facility. The findings were reported to Buenos Aires' 12th communal police station, where the head of police ordered an inspection of the facility. The investigation found a shattered skull, legs, and the other arm. It was concluded that all parts were from the same body and the autopsy revealed that baby died from a skull fracture, but the investigation did not yield any leads as to who the victim or the killer was, leaving the crime unsolved.

Two years later, on May 5, 1898, the body of a newborn with a shattered skull in an advanced state of decomposition was found. On his arms and neck were signs of first and second-degree burns. According to the forensic tests, the baby did not die from the burns; it died from severe compression of the anterior part of the neck.

During the investigation, someone noticed that the body appeared to be wrapped up in burlap. It was established that a cart had collected the garbage and human remains. With the collected items, the detectives inferred the perpetrator was either Spanish or Calabrian and was of a lower socioeconomic status.

The police started staking out the garbage cart and directing the search towards people with scarce resources and became aware of a family in the Retiro neighborhood that always dressed in mourning clothes.The family consisted of a woman named Rose Ponce de Nicola; her spouse, Cayetano Domingo Grossi (a carter by profession); Rosa's two older daughters Clara and Catalina; and three younger children.

The police learned from neighbours' testimonies that Grossi had intimate relationships with his stepdaughters. It was also established that Clara had been pregnant a short time before, and a few days later, she was in a normal state, not knowing what happened to her baby.

A day later, on May 10, a police commission ordered an inspection of a room occupied by the family, which revealed a tin containing the body of an infant wrapped in rags, thus confirming their suspicions. Grossi explained that the sack was found in a garbage bin belonging to his son Carlos, and that he had killed the baby at Clara's request, and claimed that the other baby had been a stillbirth.

That night, Rosa and her daughter Clara declared that the latter had two children with Grossi. He initially denied having sex with his stepdaughters, blaming their boyfriends for their pregnancies. A few days later, he confessed to murdering the first baby in 1896; at the same time he confessed to incinerating several more babies.

In subsequent interrogations, Grossi acknowledged having one child with Catalina and four with Clara, strangling three, the remaining two being burned by his stepdaughters. Rosa, Clara and Catalina accepted the five crimes but blamed Grossi for the deaths of the newborns.

The women's submission to the criminal, which had led them to be silent for so long, caught the police's attention. It was alleged that on one occasion Grossi tried to rape one of Rosa's younger daughters, but the sisters prevented it. Finally, it was established that Grossi himself helped with the births and then threw the babies into fire, which was witnessed by the women.

== Death sentence and execution ==
Grossi's wife Rosa and her daughters, Clara and Catalina, were considered to have concealed the homicides and were each sentenced to three years of prison and to pay court costs. Ultimately, Catalina's sentence was reduced to two years in prison.

Grossi was found guilty as the perpetrator of the murders and was sentenced to death by judge Ernesto Madero.

First lieutenants Rosa Burgos and Calisto García and captain Manuel Medrano were in charge of Grossi's execution. Grossi was blindfolded, put on the bench with his hands and feet tied, and had his sentence carried out by firing squad on April 6, 1900, at 8 AM. After the initial volley, second lieutenant Emilio Lascano approached the body and shot him in a coup de grâce.

Grossi is the first known serial killer in Argentinian history, although there is a common misconception that Cayetano Santos Godino holds the title.

== See also ==
- Death penalty
- List of serial killers by country
