= Hospital Pedro de Elizalde =

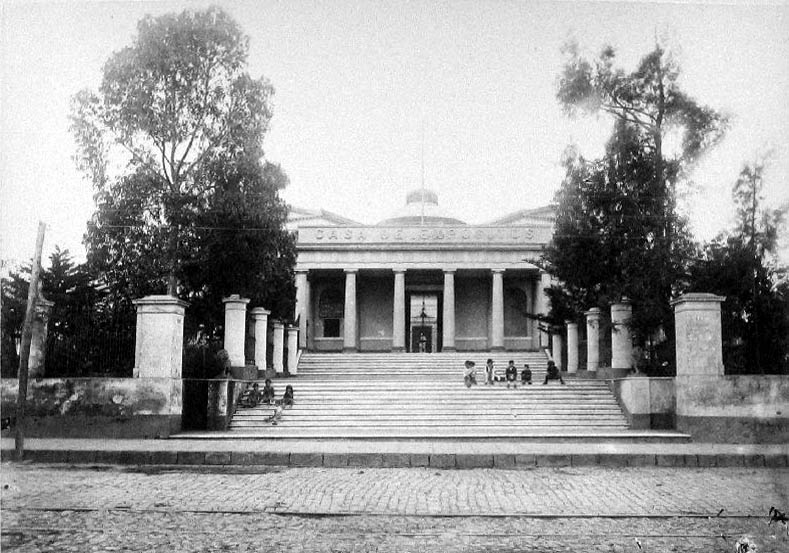
- The first building of the House of Foundlings, inaugurated in 1873. It was replaced by the current one at the beginning of the 20th century.

Geography
- Location: Buenos Aires, Argentina
- Coordinates: 34°37′45″S 58°22′38″W

Services
- Beds: 244

History
- Opened: August 7, 1779

Links
- Website: www.elizalde.gov.ar
- Lists: Hospitals in Argentina

Hospital Pedro de Elizalde is a hospital in Buenos Aires, Argentina.
