= Hospital Provincial del Centenario =

Coordinates: 32°56′18″S 60°39′53″W

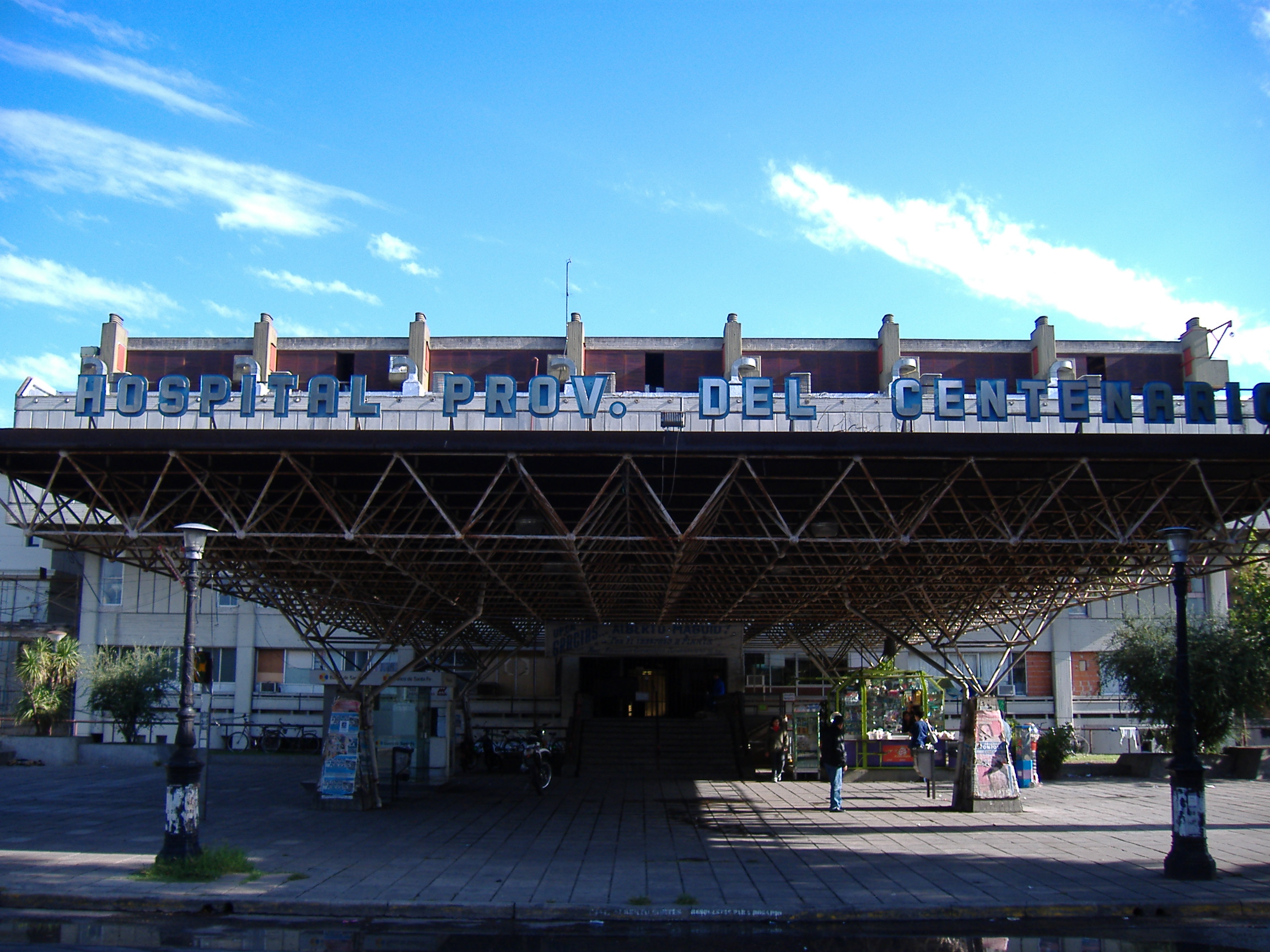
The entrance of the HPC on Urquiza St.

The Centennial Provincial Hospital (Spanish: Hospital Provincial del Centenario) is a general hospital in Rosario, Argentina, which depends on the Health Ministry of the provincial state of Santa Fe. It is a public hospital, managed partly by an elected council.

The HPC is located about ten blocks from the center of the city, on Urquiza St. and Francia Avenue. The hospital and the Faculty of Medicine of the Universidad Nacional de Rosario share a large area of 2-by-2 blocks and are communicated by inner passages.

The hospital has 183 beds and services the north and north-west part of Rosario as well as neighboring towns in the west of the Greater Rosario metropolitan area. It is the base hospital for 9 primary care centers (in administrative terms, Programmatic Area II of Zone VIII of the Santa Fe Ministry of Health).

The name of the hospital derives from its initial planning as part of the commemoration for the 100th anniversary of the 1810 May Revolution. The hospital was built in several stages, and did not acquire its present form until much later than 1910.
