= Hospital de Emergencias Psiquiátricas Marcelo Torcuato de Alvear =

Coordinates: 34.59721°S 58.4752589°W

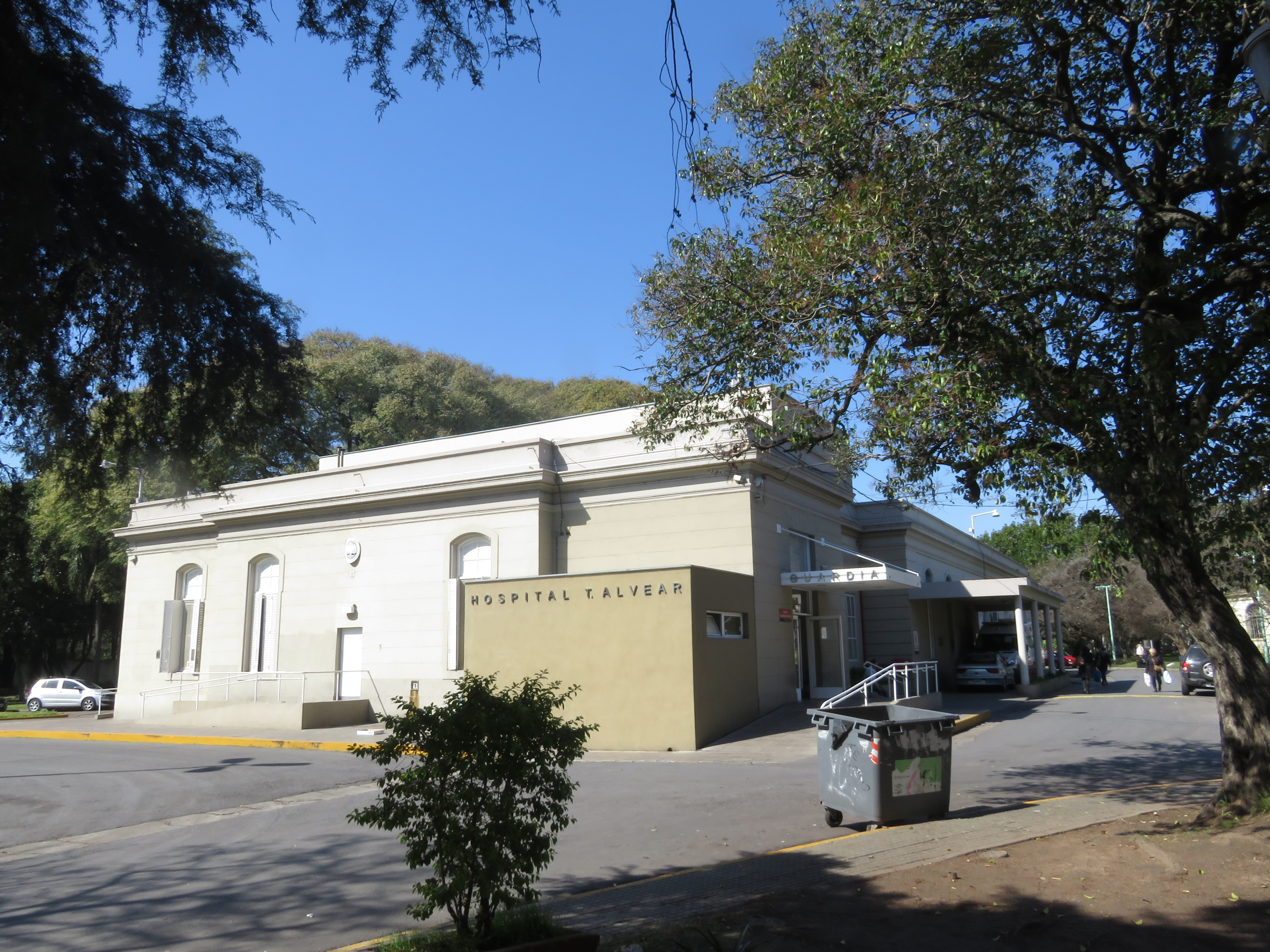

Geography
- Location: Buenos Aires, Buenos Aires, Argentina

Organisation
- Care system: Public
- Type: Mental Health

Services
- Emergency department: Yes

History
- Founded: 1908; 118 years ago

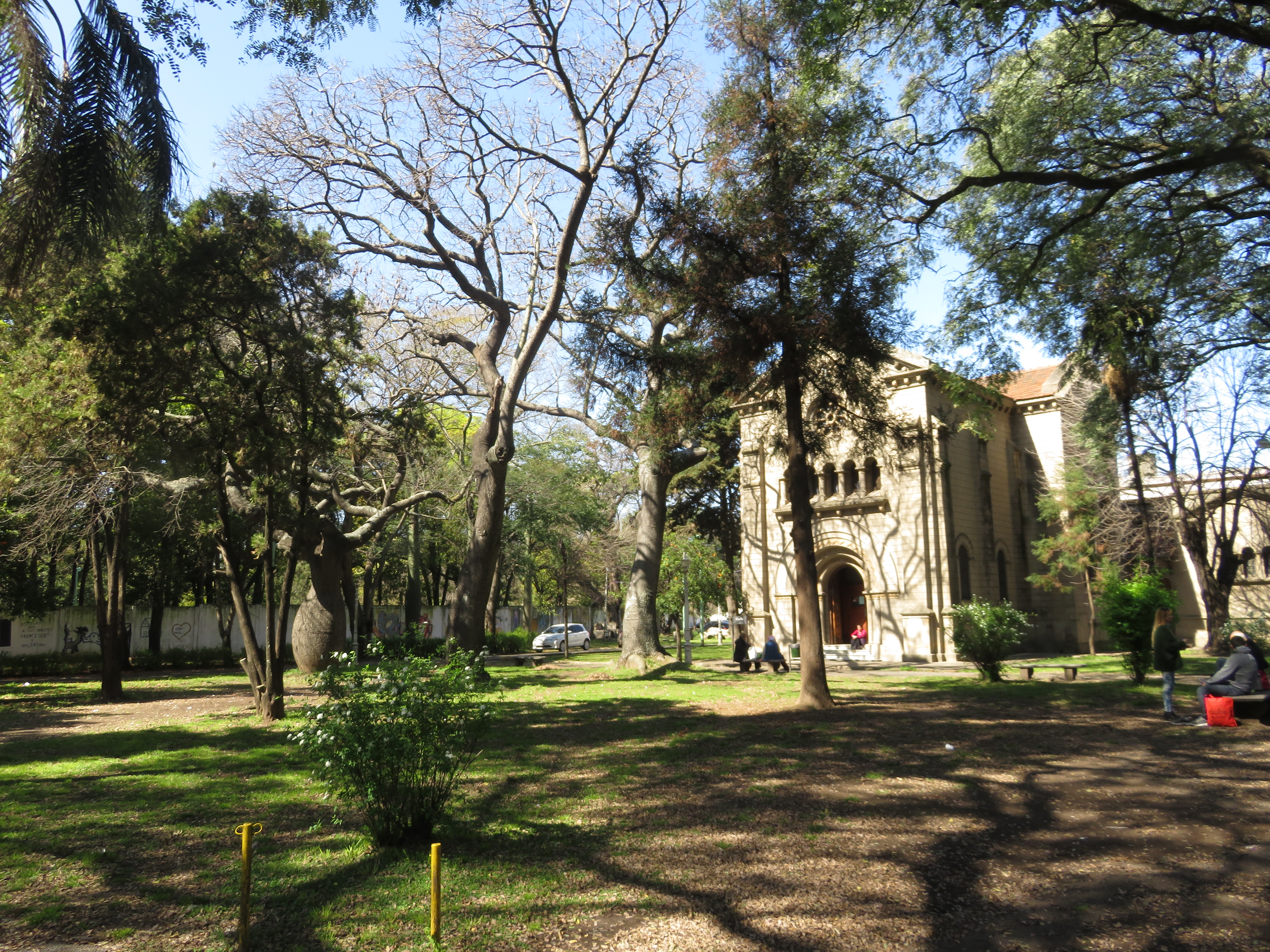

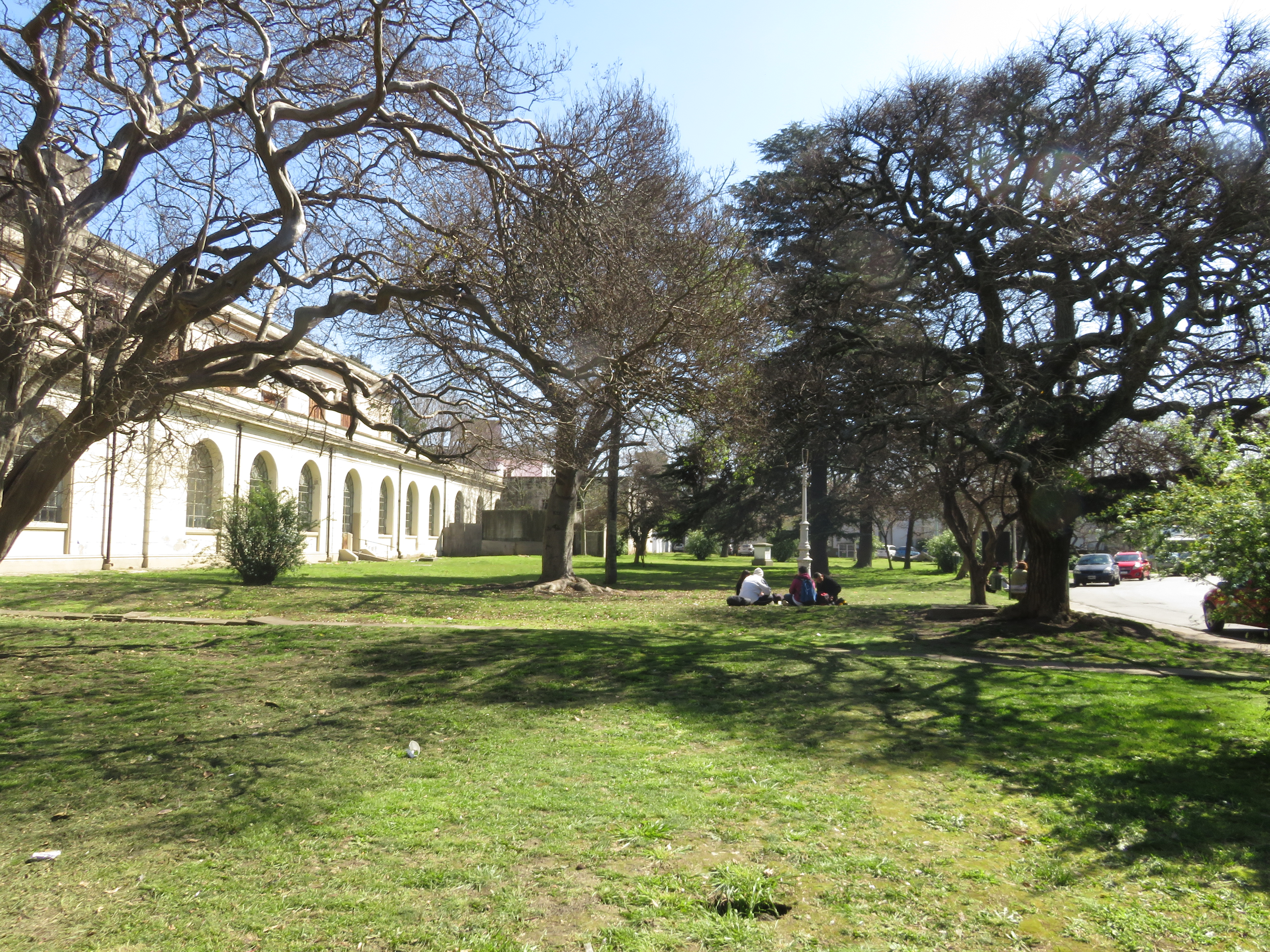

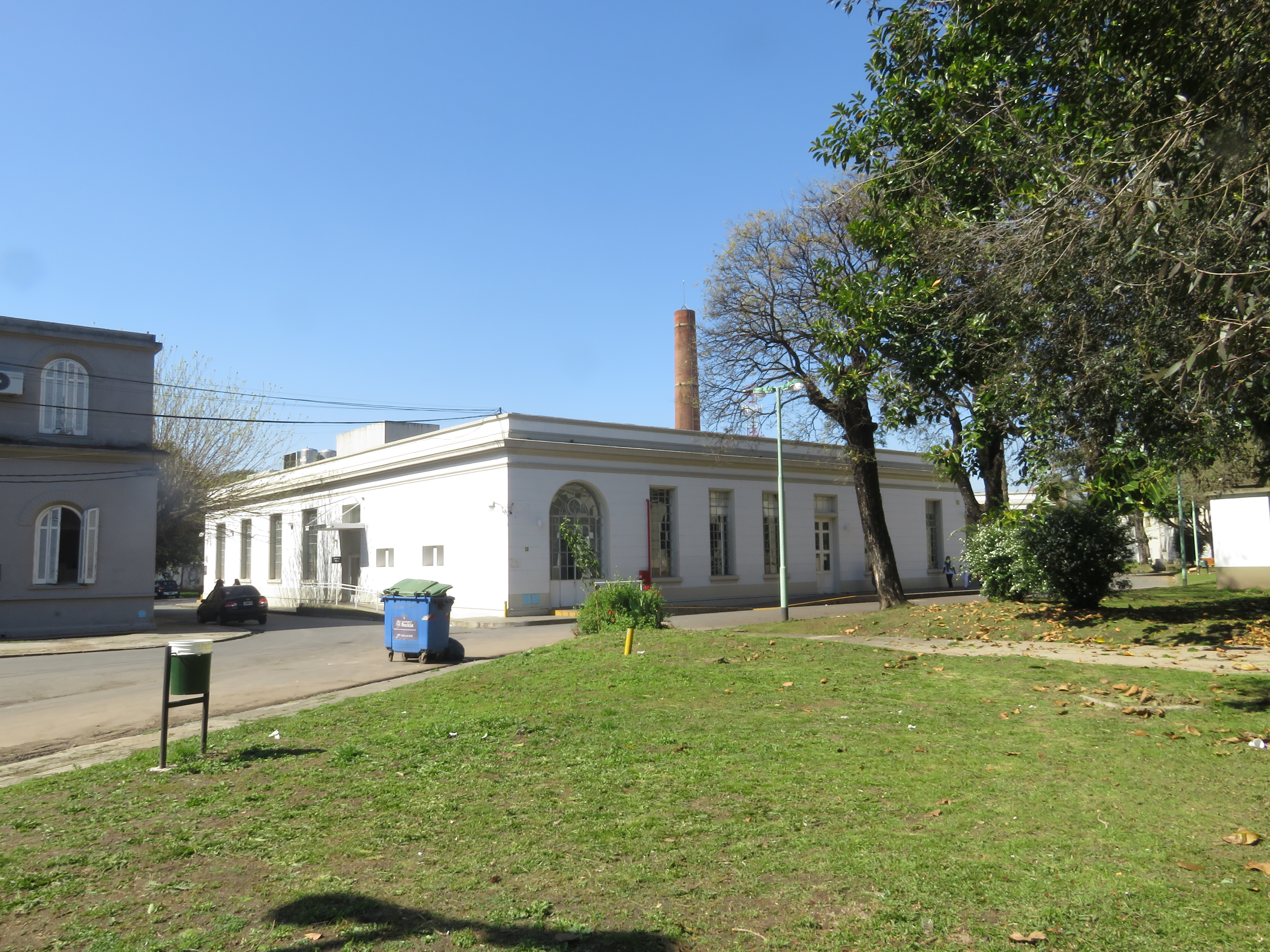

The Hospital of Psychiatric Emergencies Marcelo Torcuato de Alvear is a monovalent public hospital for acute psychiatric patients in the city of Buenos Aires, Argentina.

== Characteristics ==
Specific treatment of severe mental disorders in patients with acute psychiatric crisis in which assistance is provided to a population with very unfavorable and difficult social and family conditions.

The day hospital is part-time, with psychotherapeutic objectives that incorporate different approaches for adolescents with severe emotional disorders, but who are integrated in their corresponding schools. The hospital has its own secondary school, which follows the guidelines of the Ministry of Education and is for patients who are unable to attend a common school.

The admission to the hospitalization rooms is always done through the Hospital Guard Service. In the ground floor of the guard, whose surface is 382 square meters, are the patient rooms, observation and nursing, medical support services, clinics and waiting room, among other dependencies. On the upper floor, with an area of 151 square meters, there are spaces for doctors, nurses and residents who are on duty and other complementary areas.

This hospital is the only monovalent effector specific to the care of emergency situations in mental health in the public health system of the City of Buenos Aires, built on the basis of an interdisciplinary work model in which professionals from many disciplines work Of the field of mental health: psychologists, psychiatrists, clinical doctors, social workers, nurses, occupational therapists, psychopedagogues, nutritionists, pharmacists and others.

The hospital Alvear has ambulances integrated to the emergency network of the Government of the City of Buenos Aires.

== Services ==
- Servicio de Guardia.
- Consultorios Externos de Adultos.
- Consultorios Externos de Adolescentes.
- Sala de Internación de Varones Adultos.
- Sala de Internación de Mujeres Adultas.
- Servicio de Adolescencia.
- Sala de Internación de Varones Adolescentes.
- Sala de Internación de Mujeres Adolescentes.
- Area de Neurociencias.
- Diagnóstico por Imágenes.
- Servicio de ambulancias a través del S.A.M.E.
- Servicio Social.
- Servicio de Psicodiagnóstico.
- Laboratorio.
- Concurrencia de Psicopatología y Salud Mental.
- Residencia de Psicopatología y Salud Mental.
