= List of hospitals in Argentina =

This is a list of hospitals in Argentina. There are 5,012 hospitals in Argentina, 70% of which are private and the remaining 30% of which are public.

== City of Buenos Aires ==
- ALPI, Instituto de Rehabilitación "Marcelo Fitte"
- CEMIC, Av. Las Heras 2900
- CEMIC, Galván 4102
- FLENI, Fundación Lucha Contra Enfermedades Neurológicas Infantiles
- FUNDALEU, Fundación Argentina Contra la Leucemia
- Hospital Aeronáutico Central
- Hospital Militar Central
- Hospital Naval "Dr. Pedro Mallo"
- Complejo Médico Policial "Churruca-Visca"
- Hospital de Clínicas "José de San Martín" (UBA)
- Hospital Odontológico Universitario (UBA)
- Hospital General de Agudos "Donación Francisco Santojanni", Mataderos
- Hospital Municipal de Oncología "Marie Curie", Agronomía
- Hospital de Niños "Pedro Elizalde"
- Hospital "Manuel Belgrano"
- Hospital Alemán
- Hospital Español
- Hospital Centro Gallego de Buenos Aires
- Hospital Infanto Juvenil "C. Tobar García", Barracas
- Hospital Nacional de Pediatría "Profesor Dr. Juan P. Garrahan", Parque Patricios
- Hospital Italiano de Buenos Aires
- Hospital Francés
- Hospital Británico de Buenos Aires
- Hospital Israelita - ISRAMED
- Hospital y Administración Nacional de Laboratorios e Institutos de Salud "Dr. Carlos G. Malbrán", ANLIS
- Hospital de Infecciosas "Dr. Francisco Javier Muñiz", Parque Patricios
- Hospital General de Agudos "D. Vélez Sarsfield", Liniers
- Hospital de Emergencias Psiquiátricas Marcelo Torcuato de Alvear, Agronomía
- Hospital Odontológico (ex Nacional), Recoleta
- Hospital de Odontología "José Dueñas", Almagro
- Hospital de Odontología Infantil "Don Benito Quinquela Martín", La Boca
- Hospital de Gastroenterología "B. Udaondo", Barracas
- Hospital General de Agudos "Cosme Argerich", La Boca
- Hospital Neuropsiquiátrico de Varones "J. T. Borda", Barracas
- Hospital General de Agudos "Dr. Carlos G. Durand", Caballito
- Hospital General de Agudos "Dr. Juan A. Fernández", Palermo
- Hospital de Niños "Ricardo Gutiérrez", Palermo
- Hospital General de Niños "Pedro de Elizalde", Constitución
- Hospital de Rehabilitación Respiratoria "María Ferrer"
- Hospital General de Agudos "Dr. Ignacio Pirovano", Coghland
- Hospital Municipal de Quemados, Caballito
- Hospital General de Agudos "Dr. J. M. Ramos Mejía", Balvanera
- Hospital Materno Infantil "Ramón Sardá", Parque Patricios
- Hospital Nacional "Bernardino Rivadavia", Recoleta
- Hospital Oftalmológico "Dr. Pedro Lagleyze", Villa Gral. Mitre
- Hospital Municipal de Oftalmología "Santa Lucía", San Cristóbal
- Hospital General de Agudos "Dr. Enrique Tornú", Villa Ortúzar
- Hospital de Rehabilitación Respiratoria "M. Ferrer", Barracas
- Hospital de Salud Mental de Mujeres "Braulio Moyano", Barracas
- Hospital General de Agudos "Dr. Abel Zubizarreta", Villa Devoto
- Hospital General de Agudos "Dr. T. Alvarez", Flores
- Hospital General de Agudos "J. A. Penna", Parque Patricios
- Hospital General de Agudos "P. Piñero", Flores
- Hospital de Rehabilitacion "Manuel Rocca". Villa Real
- Hospital Udaondo
- Instituto de Zoonosis "Luis Pasteur", Caballito
- Instituto de Rehabilitación Psicofísica "I RE P". Belgrano
- Instituto de Cardiología y Cirugía Cardiovascular "F. Favaloro"
- Instituto Dupuytren de Traumatología y Ortopedia. Boedo
- Instituto de Investigaciones Médicas "Alfredo Lanari" (UBA)
- Instituto de Oncología "Angel H. Roffo" (UBA)
- Instituto de Tisioneumología "Raúl F. Vacarezza" (UBA)

== Province of Buenos Aires ==
- Hospital Interzonal General de Agudos "General José de San Martín", La Plata
- H. "El Cruce", Florencio Varela
- H. Municipal General "Anita Ellicagaray, A. Gonzáles Cháves
- H. Interzonal General de Agudos "Dr. J. Penna", Bahía Blanca
- Hospital Municipal de Agudos Dr Leónidas Lucero, Bahía Blanca
- H. Menor "Ing. White", Ingeniero White
- H. Municipal de Agudos "María Eva Duarte de Perón"
- H. Municipal, Oriente
- H. Municipal "Dr. Cabrera", Coronel Pringles
- H. Municipal "Eva Perón", Punta Alta
- H. Municipal "Dr. Raúl A. Caccavo", Coronel Suárez
- H. Municipal "Lucero del Alba", Huanguelén
- H. Municipal "Dr. Joaquín Llambías", Guaminí
- H. Menor "Dr. Ramón Carrillo", Monte Hermoso
- H. Municipal de Agudos "Dr. Pedro Ecay", Carmen de Patagones
- H. Municipal, Stroeder
- H. Municipal, Villalonga
- H. Municipal, "Dr. Emilio Ferreyra", Necochea
- H. Municipal "Gobernador Ugarte", Puán
- H. Municipal "Villa Iris", Villa Iris
- H. Local "General San Martín", Carhué
- H. de Ancianos "General N. Levalle", Carhué
- H. "Dr. Noé Yarcho", Rivera
- H. "Demetrio carmelo Layarte", Villa Mazza
- Hospital Nacional de Lepra "Dr. Baldomero Sommer", RP 24, 3.5 km RN 6, Partido General Rodríguez
- Hospital Nacional de Agudos "Profesor Dr. Alejandro Posadas", El Palomar
- Instituto Nacional de Enfermedades Virales Humanas "Dr. Julio I. Maiztegui", INEVH, Pergamino
- Hospital Regional de Agudos "San José", Pergamino
- Hospital Regional de Agudos "San Felipe", San Nicolás de los Arroyos
- Hospital “Virgen del Carmen”, Zárate

=== Northern area of Greater Buenos Aires ===
- Austral University Hospital, Pilar
- H. Municipal "Dr. Bernardo Houssay, Vicente López
- H. Zonal de Agudos y Crónicos "Dr. Cetrángolo, Vicente López
- H. de Niños Municipal "San Isidro", San Isidro
- H. Municipal de San Isidro, San Isidro
- H. Zonal General de Agudos "M. V. de Martínez", Tigre
- H. Zonal General de Agudos "Petrona V. de Cordero", San Fernando
- H. Municipal Dr. D. E. Thompson, San Martín
- H. Interzonal General de Agudos "Eva Perón" (ex Castex), San Martín
- H Zonal de Agudos "Gral. Manuel Belgrano", San Martín
- H. Municipal "Dr. R. Larcade", San Miguel
- Clínica Independencia, Munro
- Clínica Olivos, Olivos
- Sanatorio "San Lucas", San Isidro
- H. Materno Infantil "San Isidro", San Isidro
- Hospital Juan C. Sanguinetti, Pilar (Víctor Vergani 860)

=== Western area of Greater Buenos Aires ===
- H. Zonal General de Agudos "Prof. Dr. Ramón Carrillo", Ciudadela
- H. Interzonal General de Agudos "Dr. L. Güemes", Haedo
- Posadas
- H. Zonal General de Agudos "Dr. Diego Paroissien", Isidro Casanova
- H. "San Juan de Dios", Ramos Mejía
- Clínica Güemes, Luján
- Clínica Modelo Morón, Morón
- H. Virtual de Morón

=== South area of Greater Buenos Aires ===
- Emilio Burgwardt Hospital, Longchamps
- Clínica Juncal, Temperley
- Clínica Modelo de Lanús, Lanús
- Clínica Sanatorio "Modelo", Quilmes Oeste
- H. Interzonal General de Agudos "Evita", Lanús
- H. Interzonal General de Agudos "Dr. Pedro Fiorito", Avellaneda
- H. Interzonal General de Agudos "Pte. Perón", Sarandí
- H. Zonal General de Agudos "Dr. Isidoro Iriarte, Quilmes
- H. Interzonal General de Agudos "L. C. de Gandulfo", Lomas de Zamora
- H. Zonal General de Agudos "Lucio Meléndez", Adrogué
- H. Interzonal General de Agudos "J. A. Estévez", Temperley
- H. Municipal "Mi Pueblo", Florencio Varela
- H. Zonal General de Agudos Descentralizado "Evita Pueblo", Berazategui
- H. Zonal de Agudos Ezeiza, Ezeiza
- Policlínico UOM, Avellaneda

=== La Plata City Hospitals ===
- H. Interzonal General de Agudos "General San Martín"
- H. Interzonal General de Agudos "Prof. Dr. R. Rossi"
- H. Zonal General de Agudos "Dr R. Gutiérrez"
- H. Zonal General de Agudos "San Roque", Manuel B. Gonnet
- H. Interzonal General de Agudos y Crónicos "San Juan de Dios"
- H. Interzonal General de Agudos "Sor María Ludovica"
- H. Español "de La Plata"
- H. Italiano "de La Plata"
- Hospital Privado Sudamericano

== Province of Catamarca ==
- H. Provincial José Chain, Andalgalá
- H. Regional Belén, Belén
- H. Zonal de Icaño, Icaño
- H. "Roberto Ramón Carrillo", Pomán
- H. San José, Santa María
- H. Área Nº 3 "La Merced", La Merced
- H. Distrital Villa D, Las Tejas De Valle Viejo
- H. "El Rodeo", El Rodeo
- H. R. R. Carro, Chumbicha
- H. "San José, Piedra Blanca
- H. Zonal de Recreo, Recreo
- H. "Dr. Liborio Forte", Recreo
- H. Distrital de Saujil, Saujil
- H. Zonal "San Juan Bautista", Tinogasta

=== City of Catamarca ===
- H. Interzonal "San Juan Bautista"
- H. Centro de Rehabilitación
- H. Centro de Salud
- H. Interzonal de Niños

== Province of Chaco ==
=== City of Resistencia ===
- H. "Perrando"
- H. "4 de Junio", Sáenz Peña

== Province of Córdoba ==
- H. Vecinal Achiras, Achiras
- H. Vecinal Adelia María, Adelia María
- H. Municipal Alcira, Alcira
- H. de Beneficencia, Alejandro
- H. Vecinal, Alejandro
- H. M. Salvador Esca, Almafuerte
- H. Arturo Humberto, Alta Gracia
- Policlínico Ferroviario, Alta Gracia
- H. de Arias, Arias
- H. Municipal "Dr. Carlos Julio Rodríguez", Arroyito
- Complejo Asistencial Regional, Bell Ville
- H. Municipal, Buchardo
- H. Vecinal, Camilo Aldao
- H. Cañada De Luque, Cañada de Luque
- H. Municipal "San José", Canals
- H. Aurelio Crespo, Cruz del Eje
- H. Vicente Agüero, Jesús María
- H. "San Antonio de Padua", Río Cuarto
- H. Domingo Funes, Santa Maria de Punilla
- H. San Vicente de Paul, Villa del Rosario
- H. Regional de Villa Dolores, Villa Dolores
- H. Regional Pasteur, Villa Maria

=== City of Córdoba, Argentina ===
- H. Aeronáutico Cordoba
- H. Amelia S L de
- H. Español
- H. Gustavo A
- H. Hernan
- H. Italiano
- H. José
- H. Mediterráneo Central
- H. Militar Cordoba
- H. Nacional de Clínicas
- Policlínico Policial
- H. Privado S.A.
- H. Roberto J
- H. Sagrado Corazón De Jesús
- Instituto Del Quemado
- H. Aeronáutico, Av. Colón 479
- H. Aeronáutico, Av. F Aérea Arg km 6,5
- H. Córdoba
- H. de Niños
- H. de Pediatría
- H. de Urgencias
- H. Infantil Municipal
- H. Materno Provincial
- H. Misericordia, Pje Caeiro 1259
- H. Misericordia, Belgrano 1502
- H. Misericordia, Ayacucho 1700
- H. Neuropsiquiátrico
- H. Rawson
- H. San Roque
- H. T. C. de Allende
- H. Maternidad Nacional
- Policlínico Ferroviario
- Centro Dionisi de Ginecología y Cirugía Ginecológica Avanzada
- Centro de Ginecología Dr. Dionisi, Av. Vélez Sarsfield 576, Córdoba Capital

== Province of Corrientes ==
=== City of Corrientes ===
- H. "Ángela I. de Llano"
- H. Escuela "General San Martín"
- H. de Niños
- H. Psiquiátrico
- H. Geriátrico
- Instituto de Cardiología

== Province of Formosa ==
=== City of Formosa ===
- H. Central
- H. de "La Madre y el Niño"

== Province of Mendoza ==
- H. Central
- H. Luis Lagomaggiore
- H. Humberto Notti
- H. Italiano
- H. Español
- H. Español del Sur Mendocino
- H. Militar
- H. Alfredo Metraux
- H. Diego Paroissien
- H. Domingo Sicoli
- H. Carlos Saporiti
- H. Antonio Scaravelli
- H. Victorino Tagarelli
- H. Luis Chrabalowki
- H. Teodoro Schestakow
- H. Héctor E. Gailhac
- H. Alfredo Perrupato
- H. El Carmen
- H. José N. Lencinas
- H. Arturo Illia
- H. Santa Rosa
- H. Eva Perón
- H. General Alvear
- H. Malargüe
- H. El Sauce
- H. Carlos Pereyra
- H. San Juan de Dios
- H. Privado de Mendoza
- H. Universitario
- Clínica Francesa
- Clínica Suiza
- Clínica Sanatorio Mitre
- Clínica Arizu
- Clínica Schweizer
- Clínica de ojos (Fundación Dr. Zaldívar)
- Clínica Pelegrina
- Clínica Fleming
- Policlínico Sanatorio Gasa
- Clínica Colón
- Clínica Godoy Cruz
- Clínica Las Heras
- Clínica del Niño
- Clínica de ojos de San Rafael Dr. Yudowicz
- Clínica Luque
- Sanatorio Policlínico Cuyo
- Clínica Santa María
- H Santa Isabel de Hungría
- H Ramón Carrillo

== Province of Misiones ==
- H. de Área Apóstoles, Apóstoles
- Clínica Vecchia, Puerto Rico

== Province of Neuquen ==
=== City of Neuquen ===
- H. Provincial Neuquen "Prof. Dr. Castro Rendon"
- H. General "Horacio Heller"
- H. General "Bouquet Roldan"
- Centro Quirurgico Neuquen
- Centro Oncologico San Peregrino
- Clínica Pasteur
- Policlínico Neuquen
- Clánica Pediátrica "San Lucas"
- Clínica "San Agustín"
- H. Centenario
- H. Plottier
- H. Zapala
- H. Chos Malal
- H. San Martín de los Andes
- H. Cutral Co

== Province of Santa Cruz ==
- H. Regional Río Gallegos - Río Gallegos

== Province of Santa Fe ==
- H. Escuela Eva Perón, Granadero Baigorria
- H. "San Carlos", Casilda
- H. "Anselmo Gamen", Villa Gobernador Gálvez
- H. "San José", Cañada de Gómez
- H. Central, Reconquista
- H. "A. Gutiérrez", Venado Tuerto

=== Rosario ===
- Centro Regional de Salud Mental Dr. Agudo Ávila
- H. de Niños Zona Norte
- H. Geriátrico Provincial
- H. Municipal Intendente Carrasco
- Hospital Provincial de Rosario
- Hospital Provincial del Centenario
- H. Italiano Giuseppe Garibaldi de Rosario
- H. Municipal Juan B. Alberdi
- Sanatorio Británico
- H. Español de Rosario
- H. Unione e Benevolenza
- H. de Niños Víctor J. Vilela
- H. "Roque Sáenz Peña"
- H. de Emergencias Clemente Álvarez (HECA)
- Enfermeria Anglo Alemana (closed 1914)

=== San Lorenzo ===
- H. Granaderos a Caballo

== Province of Tucumán ==
- H. Aguilares, Aguilares
- H. de Concepción, Aguilares
- H. Regional Concepción, Concepción
- H. Privado SRL, Concepción
- H. Belascuain, Concepción
- H. Bella Vista, Bella Vista
- H. "Gómez Llueca, Simoca
- H. "Gral. Lamadrid", Monteros
- H. "Juan Bautista Alberdi", Juan Bautista Alberdi
- H. "Gral. Lamadrid ", Graneros
- H. "Los Sarmientos", Los Sarmientos
- H. "Mario Stivala", La Cocha
- H. Parajón Ortiz, Famailla
- H. "Santa Ana", Santa Ana
- H. Tafí del Valle, Tafí Del Valle
- H. Trancas, Trancas
- H. Avellaneda, Las Talitas
- H. "Ramón Humberto, Lamadrid
- H. "Santa Lucía", Santa Lucía

=== City of Tucumán ===
- H. Ángel C. Padilla
- H. Centro de Salud "Zenón Sant"
- H. "del Niño Jesús"
- H. "Juan Obarrio"
- H. "Nicolás Avellaneda"
- H. Privado de Flebología
- H. Privado de Ojos
- H. Psiquiátrico "del Carmen"
- H. de Niños Soc. Arg. de Pediatría
