= Arthur Loves Plastic discography =

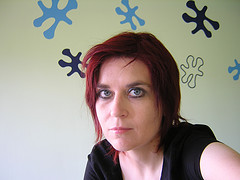
- Studio albums: 21
- Extended plays: 5
- Soundtrack albums: 1
- Compilation albums: 2

The discography of Arthur Loves Plastic, the performing name of electronic music artist Bev Stanton, consists of twenty-one studio albums, two compilation albums, one soundtrack and five extended plays. Arthur Loves Plastic was formed in 1994 in Washington, D.C., and Stanton is also acknowledged as a "remix master", as well as performing as a Beltway club DJ.

Arthur Loves Plastic's debut was the extended play Sperm Warfare, which was released on the British T.E.Q. Music? label in March 1995. Following the collapse of the label, Stanton has released most of her music on her own Machine Heart Music label. Arthur Loves Plastic's latest is the album Strings, which was released in February 2013.

== Studio recordings ==
=== Studio albums ===
Year	Album
1995	The Zero State
1996	Professor Fate
1997	Teflon Diva!
1998	Slice
1999	Klondyke 5
2000	Second Avenue Detour
2001	Fixed Star
2002	No Nations, No Peoples
2003	Nadir
2003	Higher Fruit
2004	Savage Bliss
2005	Love or Perish
2006	Pursuit of Happiness
2006	Troubled
2007	Beneath the Watchful Eyes
2008	Brief Episodes of Joy
2008	King Shag
2009	Give It
2010	Deeper
2012	Special When Lit
2013	Strings

=== Compilation albums ===
Year	Album	Label
2001	The Tapegerm Mixes	
2004	Arthur Loves Plastic	Machine Heart Music

=== Soundtrack albums ===
Year	Album	Label
2010	The Blue Room	Machine Heart Music

=== Extended plays ===
Year	Extended play	Label
1995	Sperm Warfare	T.E.Q. Music?
2001	Who Do You Trust?	Machine Heart Music
2005	Interludes	Machine Heart Music
2010	Touch	Machine Heart Music
2011	Love Is All Around	Machine Heart Music

== Remixes by Arthur Loves Plastic ==
Remixes of other artists tracks by Arthur Loves Plastic.

=== Compilation albums ===
Year	Album
2001	Remixes

=== Extended plays ===
Year	Extended play
1998	DCremixes
1999	Remixes 2
2000	Remixes 3
2001	Remixes 4

== Remixes of Arthur Loves Plastic ==
Remixes of Arthur Loves Plastic tracks by other artists.

=== Albums ===
Year	Album
1998	Arthur Loves Plasticulae
2003	Mega Mix
2004	Downtempo Diva
2004	Queen of the World

=== Extended plays ===
Year	Extended play
1997	The Complete Teflon Diva! Remixes
1999	Ashtray Remixes
2001	Fixed Star Remixes
2002	Fixed Star Remixes 2
2003	Feel the Love

== Appearances on compilation albums ==
Compilation albums that include tracks by Arthur Loves Plastic.

Year	Album
1997	Abort, Retry, or Fail Vol. 2
1998	Abort, Retry, or Fail Vol. 3
1998	Subcon.01
1999	Noise Kills Punk Dead
2000	Please Rewind and Play Again III
2000	Please Rewind and Play Again IV
2000	Walking on Pennsylvania Avenue: The Sounds of DC
2000	World Wide Kind
2001	African Icons of Power Vol. 1: Defeat the Enemy
2006	World Wide Kind 2
2007	The Underground Sound of DC: D.C.'s Finest Electronica Musicians Vol. 1
2013	Magick, Music and Ritual 9
