= The Pursuit of Happiness =

The Pursuit of Happiness may refer to "Life, Liberty and the pursuit of Happiness", a phrase in the United States Declaration of Independence, as well as:

== Films ==
- The Pursuit of Happiness (1934 film), starring Joan Bennett
- The Pursuit of Happiness (1971 film), directed by Robert Mulligan, based on Thomas Rogers' novel of the same name
- The Pursuit of Happiness (1988 film), an Australian film directed by Martha Ansara
- Pursuit of Happiness (film), a 2001 film starring Frank Whaley, Annabeth Gish, and Amy Jo Johnson
- The Pursuit of Happyness, 2006 film based on a true story about Chris Gardner, a father who battled homelessness while training to be a stockbroker

== Music ==
- The Pursuit of Happiness (band), a Canadian power-pop band
- Pursuit of Happiness (Arthur Loves Plastic album)
- Pursuit of Happiness (Weekend Players album)
- The Pursuit of Happiness (Beat Farmers album), 1987
- "Pursuit of Happiness" (song), by Kid Cudi (Ft. MGMT and Ratatat)
- "The Pursuit of Happiness" by Band of Susans from Love Agenda

== Books ==
- The Pursuit of Happiness: A Book of Studies and Storwings, an 1893 non-fiction book by Daniel Garrison Brinton
- The Pursuit of Happiness, a 1968 novel by Thomas Rogers
- The Pursuit of Happiness, a 2001 novel by Douglas Kennedy
- The Pursuit of Happiness, How Classical Writers on Virtue Inspired the Lives of the Founders and Defined America, a 2024 non-fiction book by Jeffrey Rosen.

== Television ==
- The Pursuit of Happiness (1987 TV series), a 1987–1988 TV series starring Paul Provenza
- The Pursuit of Happiness (1995 TV series), an American sitcom
