= Teflon President =

Teflon President may refer to:

- Luiz Inácio Lula da Silva, the current president of Brazil
- Ma Ying-jeou, president of Taiwan from 2008 to 2016
- Ronald Reagan, president of the United States from 1981 to 1989

== See also ==
- Bertie Ahern, Taoiseach of Ireland, the Teflon Taoiseach
- Angela Merkel, chancellor of Germany, the Teflon Chancellor
- Mark Rutte, prime minister of the Netherlands, Teflon Mark
- Teflon Don (disambiguation)
- Teflon John (disambiguation)
