= Second (disambiguation) =

A second is the base unit of time in the International System of Units (SI).

Second, Seconds, The Second, or (The) 2nd may also refer to:

== Mathematics ==
- 2 (number), as an ordinal (also written as 2nd or 2d)
- Second of arc, an angular measurement unit, 1/3600 of a degree

== Music ==
- Second (band), a Spanish rock group from Murcia

=== Notes and intervals ===
- Augmented second, an interval in classical music
- Diminished second, unison
- Major second, a whole tone
- Minor second, semitone
- Neutral second one-and-a-half semitones

=== Albums ===
- The Second, second studio album by rock band Steppenwolf
- The 2nd (album), a 2006 album by Hater
- Seconds (The Dogs D'Amour album), released in 2000
- Seconds (Kate Rogers album), released in 2005
- Seconds (Tim Berne album), released in 2007

=== EPs ===
- 2nd, a 1996 EP by The Rasmus
- Second (EP), a 2005 EP by Baroness
- Second, a 2014 EP by Raye

=== Songs ===
- "Second", a 2019 song by Erika Costell
- "Second", a 2020 song by Hope D
- "Second", a song from Sleaford Mods' 2020 compilation album All That Glue
- "Second" (song), a 2021 song by Hyoyeon
- "Seconds", from The Human League's 1981 album Dare
- "Seconds" (song), from U2's 1983 album War
- "Seconds", from Le Tigre's 2004 album This Island

== Film and television ==
- The 2nd (film), an American 2020 film starring Ryan Phillippe
- The Second (film), a 2018 Australian film directed by Mairi Cameron, winner of the 2018 AACTA Award for Best Indie Film
- Seconds (1966 film), a US thriller directed by John Frankenheimer
- Seconds (2014 film), an Indian Malayalam-language thriller film by Aneesh Upasana
- "Seconds" (The Batman), an episode in the American animated TV series
- "Seconds", an episode of the American TV series Lois & Clark: The New Adventures of Superman

== Places ==
- 2nd meridian east, a line of longitude extending through Europe and Africa
- 2nd meridian west, a line of longitude extending through Europe and Africa
- 2nd parallel north, a circle of latitude above the Equator
- 2nd parallel south, a circle of latitude below the Equator
- 2nd Street (disambiguation)
- Second Avenue (disambiguation)

== Publications ==
- Seconds, an interview magazine published from 1987–2000.
- Seconds (comics), a 2014 graphic novel by Bryan Lee O'Malley

== Science ==
- Second of right ascension, in astronomy
- Specific Impulse (rocket engine)

== Dates ==
- Second of the month, a recurring calendar date
  - Second of January
  - Second of February
  - Second of March
  - Second of April
  - Second of May
  - Second of June
  - Second of July
  - Second of August
  - Second of September
  - Second of October
  - Second of November
  - Second of December

== Sports, games, and dueling ==
- Second in a duel, the agent of the participant
- Second, the cornerman in combative sports such as boxing
- Second (chess), assistant to a chess player
- Second (climbing), the climber who belays the lead climber in lead climbing
- Second (curling), delivers the second set of stones in curling
- Second dealing, a way of cheating in card games

== Other uses ==
- Albéric Second, a French journalist and writer
- Factory second, a new product sold for a discount because of minor imperfections
- Second (parliamentary procedure), to formally support a motion or resolution
- Second hand or used goods, items that have been used before being resold
- Second-class degree, a class of academic degree in countries based on the British system of education
- Second-in-command, a deputy commander in British and Commonwealth armies

== See also ==
- Secondment, a transfer of an employee, usually within an organization
- Segundo (disambiguation)
- SND (disambiguation)
- Second grade
- Secondary (disambiguation)
