= Beneath the Watchful Eyes =

Studio album by Arthur Loves Plastic
- Released: 31 March 2007
- Genre: Electronica
- Length: 45:40
- Label: Machine Heart Music
- Producer: Bev Stanton

Arthur Loves Plastic album chronology
Troubled (2006)	Beneath the Watchful Eyes (2007)	Brief Episodes of Joy (2008)

Professional ratings
Review scores
Source	Rating
Church of Girl	favorable
Collected Sounds	favorable
Dead Earnest	favorable
Smother Magazine	favorable

Beneath the Watchful Eyes is the fifteenth album from Arthur Loves Plastic, and was released in 2007.

== Awards ==
Beneath the Watchful Eyes won the 2007 Wammie for the Best Recording in the Electronica Category. In the 2009 Just Plain Folks Music Awards, the track "Women Alone" was nominated in the Techno Song category.

== Release notes ==
"Mischievous techno-inspired electronica."

== Track listing ==
All tracks are written by Bev Stanton.

No.	Title	Length
1.	"Rainbow Bridge"	3:23
2.	"Dark Side"	3:00
3.	"Free"	2:49
4.	"We Will Remember"	2:58
5.	"Hollow"	3:56
6.	"Empty PhilHarmonic"	2:37
7.	"The Grind"	1:55
8.	"If You Could See Me Now"	3:08
9.	"Afterglow"	3:06
10.	"I'll Be There"	3:17
11.	"Despair"	2:09
12.	"Women Alone"	2:48
13.	"Let's Do It!"	2:44
14.	"Misfortune"	3:00
15.	"The Puritans"	4:50
Total length:		45:40

== Personnel ==
- Produced by Bev Stanton in the Flamingo Room, Silver Spring, MD.

=== Additional musicians ===
- Heavy Lids - Featuring (1, 15)
- Lisa Moscatiello - Vocals (3, 4, 5, 6, 7, 8, 9, 11)
- Virus Factory - Loops (3) ^{*}
- Lisa Moscatiello - Guitar (5, 8)
- Mental Anguish - Loops (7, 13) ^{*}
- Cystem - Guitar Loop (9, 14) ^{*}
- Eric Wenberg - Guitar (11)
- DJ Get Yo Fat On - Loops (12, 13) ^{*}
- International Garbageman - Loops (12) ^{*}
- Heuristics Inc. - Loops (13) ^{*}
- Robbie Magruder - Drums (13)

^{*} Remixed for The Tapegerm Collective

=== Samples ===
- Suki Taylor - Spoken Word (5)
- Sample from "'Tis the Last Rose of Summer" from American Music for Two Guitarists by Phil Mathieu and George Cavallaro (6)
- Dialogue from Nights of Love in Lesbos, a reading of The Songs of Bilitis by Pierre Louÿs (12)
- Narration from Jason Fortuny's "Craigslist Experiment" (13)
- Dialogue from the 1968 film The Killing of Sister George (14)

== Credits ==
- Eli Wadley - Cover photo
