= Brief Episodes of Joy =

Studio album by Arthur Loves Plastic
- Released: 28 January 2008
- Genre: Electronica
- Length: 40:54
- Label: Machine Heart Music
- Producer: Bev Stanton

Arthur Loves Plastic album chronology
Beneath the Watchful Eyes (2007)	Brief Episodes of Joy (2008)	King Shag (2008)

Professional ratings
Review scores
Source	Rating
Collected Sounds	favorable
Dead Earnest	favorable

Brief Episodes of Joy is the sixteenth album from Arthur Loves Plastic and was released in 2008.

== Awards ==
Brief Episodes of Joy won the 2008 Wammie for Best Recording in the Electronica Category. In the 2009 Just Plain Folks Music Awards Brief Episodes of Joy was nominated in the Electronica Album category, while the track "Unbelievable (Techno Squirrels remixed by ALP)" was nominated in the Electronica Song category.

== Release notes ==
"Lisa Moscatiello lends her vocals to this brooding release that explores the depths between twilight and sunrise."

== Track listing ==
All tracks are written by Bev Stanton, except where noted.

No.	Title	Length
1.	"I Want You"	3:09
2.	"SOL"	3:17
3.	"IZE"	2:54
4.	"Naked"	3:07
5.	"Lesbian Gang"	2:27
6.	"Love Me Right"	3:39
7.	"Friendly Fire"	2:58
8.	"It's Never Gonna Stop"	3:09
9.	"Looking for a Prince"	2:29
10.	"Time Marches On"	2:31
11.	"Black Cloud"	2:39
12.	"Smile"	2:41
13.	"Unbelievable" (Techno Squirrels remixed by ALP)	5:54
Total length:		40:54

The track "Time Marches On" is also known as "Killer Bees".

== Personnel ==
- Produced by Bev Stanton in the Flamingo Room and at Sligo House, Silver Spring, MD.

=== Additional musicians ===
- Lisa Moscatiello - Vocals (1, 2, 7, 8, 10, 12)
- Lisa Moscatiello - Guitar (2, 4, 8)
- Cystem - Guitar Loops (3, 9, 11, 12) ^{*}
- Jon Nazdin - Bass (5)
- Robbie Magruder - Drums (10, 11)

^{*} Remixed for The Tapegerm Collective

=== Samples ===
- Dialogue from "Nights of Love in Lesbos", a reading of The Songs of Bilitis by Pierre Louÿs (4)
