= Teflon (disambiguation) =

Teflon is a registered trademark of the Chemours company used for polytetrafluoroethylene (and other fluoropolymers).

Teflon may also refer to:

== Chemicals ==
- Teflon AF, copolymers of tetrafluoroethylene and 2,2-bis(trifluoromethyl)-4,5-difluoro-1,3-dioxole used as membrane materials
- Teflon FEP, fluorinated ethylene propylene used as a high-temperature insulation for wire
- Teflon tape or thread seal tape, (use deprecated by the trademark owner)

== Music ==
- "Teflon" (song), a 1998 song by the Australian band Jebediah
- "Teflon", a song on the album Octahedron by the American band The Mars Volta

== See also ==
- Teflon Brothers, a hip hop and rap group from Helsinki, Finland
- Teflon Diva!, a 1997 album by Arthur Loves Plastic
- Teflon-coated bullet, bullets that have been covered with a coating of polytetrafluoroethylene
- Teflon flu, inhalation fever caused by the fumes released when polytetrafluoroethylene is heated
- Teflon Don (disambiguation)
