= Molière authorship question =

The Molière authorship question has been the subject of some dispute since 1919, when Pierre Louÿs, in two articles entitled respectively Corneille est-il l'auteur d'Amphitryon ? and L'imposteur de Corneille et le Tartuffe de Molière, announced that he had uncovered a literary trickery. According to him, Molière had only been Corneille's pen name, according to a practice that Louÿs believed to be common, but which was in fact only found in 17th century literature pamphleteer and in certain collections of scholarly farces from the beginning of the century.

Louÿs was thus following in the footsteps of Abel Lefranc, who had just contributed to the questioning of the paternity of William Shakespeare's works by publishing, in 1918 and 1919, two volumes of an essay entitled Sous le masque de William Shakespeare : William Stanley, VI^{e} comte de Derby. Throughout his career Louÿs had himself multiplied publications under different pseudonyms; he had even made himself famous by passing off his Chansons de Bilitis as an original collection of Greek poetry translated by him, but never yet had he mentioned, in his extensive correspondence, a possible connection between Corneille and Molière. The fuss surrounding the publication of Abel Lefranc's essay enabled him to transpose to Molière the doubt that some English-speaking authors, long before Abel Lefranc, had insinuated about Shakespeare and thus to lend Corneille the same taste for pseudonymity.

This controversy, which was taken up again from time to time in the 20th century after the outburst of Pierre Louÿs, has been renewed and intensified since the beginning of the 2000s, notably with the publication of two articles inspired by statistical methodology, and seeking to prove the proximity between the vocabulary and syntax of Corneille and Molière.

As in the case of Shakespeare, this theory is considered inconsistent by Corneille specialists and Molière, and more broadly by all historians of French literature and theatre, who do not even allude to it. The most recent textual analysis work confirms, using methods from stylometry, that Molière's plays and Corneille's were written by two different authors.
