= Higher Fruit =

Studio album by Arthur Loves Plastic
- Released: August 2003
- Genre: Electronica
- Length: 43:48
- Label: Machine Heart Music
- Producer: Bev Stanton

Arthur Loves Plastic album chronology
Nadir (2003)	Higher Fruit (2003)	Savage Bliss (2004)

Professional ratings
Review scores
Source	Rating
Aural Innovations	favorable
Church of Girl	favorable
Collected Sounds	favorable
Side-Line	favorable
Smother Magazine	favorable
Washington Blade	favorable

Higher Fruit is the tenth album from Arthur Loves Plastic and was released in 2003.

== Awards ==
Higher Fruit hola.

== Release notes ==
"Consider this your soundtrack on the road to transcendance. Features remixes of tracks by pop goddess Linda Smith and folk sensation Verlette Simon, as well as the return of the DIVA, Lisa Moscatiello."

== Track listing ==
All tracks are written by Bev Stanton, except where noted.

No.	Title	Writer(s)	Length
1.	"Heaven"		4:16
2.	"Concept of Love"		3:04
3.	"Vapour"		2:50
4.	"Feel the Love"		3:44
5.	"Proceed"		3:13
6.	"Silent Now"	Craig Conley, Michael Warwick	4:49
7.	"That's Right, That's Us"		3:13
8.	"Sorry" (Verlette Simon remixed by ALP)		3:41
9.	"Super Soul"		4:31
10.	"Where You Are" (Linda Smith remixed by ALP)		3:20
11.	"Drama Queen"		3:26
12.	"In the Here and Now"		3:41
Total length:			43:48

== Personnel ==
- Produced by Bev Stanton in the Flamingo Room, Silver Spring, MD.
- Mastered by Bill Wolf, Wolf Productions

=== Additional musicians ===
- Ryan Fitzgerald - Loops (2) ^{*}
- CRT - Loops (2) ^{*}
- Scott Carr - Loops (3) ^{*}
- Chris Phinney - Loops (3, 5) ^{*}
- Lisa Moscatiello - Vocals (4, 6, 12)
- Dub Jay - Loops (5) ^{*}
- Captive Audience - Composer (6)
- Araden - Loops (7) ^{*}
- Adam is God - Loops (9) ^{*}
- Heather Heimbuch - Vocals (11)
- Smartbomb - Guitar (11)
- Dave Chappell - Guitar (12)

^{*} Remixed for The Tapegerm Collective

== Credits ==
- Sanoma Lee Kellogg - Cover photo
