= No Nations, No Peoples =

Studio album by Arthur Loves Plastic
- Released: September 14, 2002
- Genre: Electronica
- Length: 47:50
- Label: Hexagon Records
- Producer: Bev Stanton

Arthur Loves Plastic album chronology
Fixed Star (2001)	No Nations, No Peoples (2002)	Nadir (2003)

Professional ratings
Review scores
Source	Rating
Aural Innovations	favorable
Collected Sounds	favorable
Music Monthly	favorable
UndergroundBeatOnline	favorable

No Nations, No Peoples is the eighth album from Arthur Loves Plastic and was released in 2002. In 2005, No Nations, No Peoples was reissued on Bev Stanton's own Machine Heart Music label.

== Release notes ==
"Have those subway rides beneath federal buildings on high-alert days cramped your style? Don't despair! Join ALP in trippy tributes to better living through stimulants and downtempo missives against globalization."

== Track listing ==
All tracks are written by Bev Stanton, except where noted.

No.	Title	Writer(s)	Length
1.	"Post Hypnotic" (Mental Anguish remixed by ALP)		3:13
2.	"Bang Bang"		2:55
3.	"Dreamer of Dreams"		3:15
4.	"Mudslide"		6:08
5.	"Now More Than Ever"		2:57
6.	"Alright"		2:45
7.	"No Nations, No Peoples"		1:37
8.	"Throw It Away"		3:59
9.	"Turn On Together"		3:30
10.	"Metro Morning"		2:40
11.	"Ennex" (Autocad remixed by ALP)	Thomas Park	2:43
12.	"The Search"		3:56
13.	"Move On"		3:12
14.	"Trust"		2:16
15.	"The Oath" (Autocad remixed by ALP)	Park	2:44
Total length:			47:50

== Personnel ==
- Recorded by Bev Stanton in the Flamingo Room, Silver Spring, MD.
- Mastered by Bill Wolf, Wolf Productions, Alexandria, VA.

=== Additional musicians ===
- Daryl Westfall - Loops (2) ^{*}
- Chris Phinney - Loops (3) ^{*}
- Lisa Moscatiello - Vocals (4, 8)
- Windlestraw - Loops (5) ^{*}
- International Garbageman - Loops (6) ^{*}
- Ciyd - Loops (9, 10) ^{*}
- Melody Whore - Loops (12) ^{*}
- Margie Perez - Vocals (14)

^{*} Remixed for The Tapegerm Collective

=== Samples ===
- Dialogue from the film Willy Wonka & the Chocolate Factory (3)
- Dialogue from the film Network (7)

== Credits ==
- Album cover designed by Scot Howard, The Digital Butterfly Project
