= Manuel de civilité pour les petites filles à l'usage des maisons d'éducation =

Book by Pierre Louÿs

The Manuel de civilité pour les petites filles à l'usage des maisons d'éducation (English: Handbook of behaviour for little girls to be used in educational establishments) is an erotic literary work by the French writer Pierre Louÿs, written in 1917 and published posthumously and anonymously in 1926.

It takes the form of a parody of the rigorous educational handbooks of the time, and is thus composed of short pieces of advice (generally a sentence or two) arranged into topics: "At home", "Duties towards your mother", "In class", etc. The tone of the work is sharp, even concise, the style particularly believable and chatty. Pierre Louÿs uses irony readily to evoke the cheap loves of the perverse young girls, and this relative distance enables him to despise any moral censure (incest, paedophilia...). In fact, one is far from the invaluable refinement of the Songs of Bilitis for example. The Handbook of civility is undoubtedly the most subversive work of Louÿs, a true attack against the middle-class puritanism of the Belle Époque.

By the way of illustration, the "Glossary" which opens the work comprises this warning:

We have considered it useless to explain the words: cunt, slit, fanny, mound, cock, tail, bollock, testicle, cum (verb), cum (noun), erection, masturbate, suck, lick, pump, kiss, fellate, screw, fuck, ass-fuck, ejaculate, dildo, lesbian, dyke, sixty-nine, cunnilingus, cute, whore, brothel. These words are familiar to all little girls.

The edition of the work published at Librio is marked "for informed readers". Some of the book's counsels were illustrated by cartoonist Loïc Dubigeon under the title of Handbook of behaviour for the use of "big" girls.

== Editions ==
- A Handbook of Good Manners for Little Girls; Especially Recommended For Use In Schools by Pierre Louÿs, translated by Sabine D’Estrée (Richard Seaver). Grove Press, New York, 1971.
- The Young Girl's Handbook of Good Manners for Use in Educational Establishments by Pierre Louÿs, translated by Geoffrey Longnecker. Wakefield Press, Cambridge, 2010.
