= Les aventures du roi Pausole =

Opérette by Arthur Honegger

- Opérette by Arthur Honegger
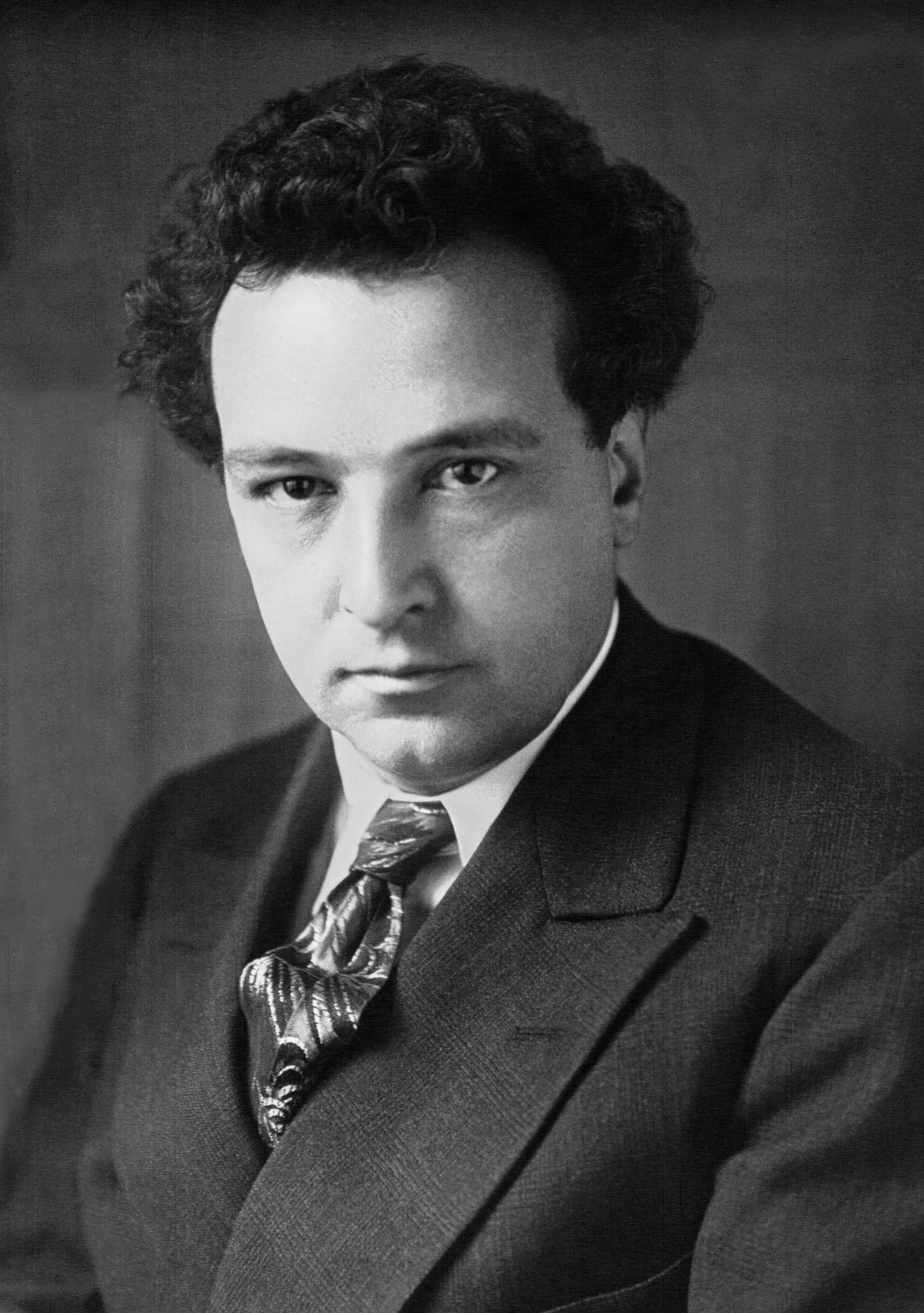
- The composer in 1928
- Translation: The adventures of King Pausole
- Librettist: Albert Willemetz
- Language: French
- Based on: novel by Pierre Louÿs
- Premiere: 12 December 1930; Bouffes Parisiens

Les aventures du roi Pausole (The adventures of King Pausole) is an opérette in three acts with music by Arthur Honegger and a French libretto by Albert Willemetz, based on the 1901 novel by Pierre Louÿs. It was Honegger's third operatic work, but his first in lighter vein, composed between May and November 1930, and dedicated to Fernand Ochsé. Excluding dialogue, there is around 75 minutes of music, making it longer than many of his more serious works. While showing the influence of Mozart, Chabrier and Messager, it contains a wide range of orchestral colours with occasional glances at jazz of the 1930s.

== Performance history ==
Les aventures du roi Pausole was first performed at the Bouffes Parisiens on 12 December 1930, and ran for nearly 500 nights. The opera was revived at the Théâtre des Capucines in 1947 and in Lausanne in 1990. A Toulon Opera production was also seen at the Opéra-Comique in 2004. The Grand Théâtre de Genève set up a production by Robert Sandoz in 2012, conducted by Claude Schnitzler. The complete score was recorded in August 1992 at Albisrieden church in Zurich. Honegger's score has been described as "out of the ordinary - fresh, biting, wide-ranging with a ballet and a tiny cantata, a bubbling Rossinian septet for women's voices, parodies of operetta styles (Second Empire and Belle Epoque), jazz..."

Along with the creators of principal roles, the original cast included Simone Simon, Suzy Delair and Edwige Feuillère as queens.

Crichton cited several reactions after the premiere, including "risqué" in Traubner's Operetta, "rather daring" for the Louÿs source in Harding's Folies de Paris, "distinctly erotic" in New Grove Opera, and "completely scandalous... the filthiest libretto in opera history" in the Viking Opera Guide but simply "ingeniously cheeky" for Pierre-Octave Ferroud, who added that "Les Aventures du Roi Pausole is the rediscovered miracle of certain Offenbach scores based on texts by Meilhac and Halévy". Stan Golestan also makes the connection with Offenbach: "the somewhat acidic harmonies will no doubt disconcert operetta audiences, but the novelty of the score is obvious and the Bouffes-Parisiens have remembered their founder - Jacques Offenbach, who also renewed and built from scratch a genre that made the glory of his theatre."

In 1933 Alexis Granowsky made a film version of the Louÿs original with André Berley and Josette Day.

== Roles ==
| Role | Voice type | Premiere Cast, 12 December 1930 (Conductor: Honegger) |
|---|---|---|
| Le Roi Pausole | baritone | Dorville |
| Giglio, the king's page | tenor | Fred Pasquali |
| The Grand Eunuch, Taxis | tenor | René Koval |
| Le métayer | bass | Louis Blanche |
| The Fair Aline, daughter of the king | soprano | Jacqueline Francell |
| Mirabelle | mezzo-soprano | Meg Lemonnier |
| Diane à la Houppe | soprano | Germaine Duclos |
| Dame Perchuque | mezzo-soprano | Claude de Sivry |
| Thiérrette | soprano | Regina Paris |
| La Reine Giselle | soprano | Moussia |
Subjects, Wives of the king, farm girls, soubrettes, etc (chorus)

== Synopsis ==
=== Act I ===
In the harem of Pausole, king of Tryphème
Although in Pausole's kingdom morals are somewhat relaxed, and the monarch has a wife for each day of the year, in respect of his own daughter the king is more strict. During a ballet given for the women of the harem, Aline falls for Mirabelle, a girl dressed as a boy dancer Prince Charming. While the king holds court under a cherry-tree – and lets off all the wrong-doers – Aline runs off to a farm with 'Mirabelle'. But even after reading Aline's note (saying she will return in nine months...) the king is indecisive. Finally he follows the advice of his page Giglio and sets off in search of his daughter.

=== Act II ===
At the Golden Cockerel farm
The seven farmers get everything ready for the arrival of the king. The farm is the only place to stay on the Tryphème road, and Aline and Mirabelle have stopped here. Mirabelle reveals to Aline that she is in 'travesty' but though surprised by the revelation Aline is none the less eager for experiment. After a duet they disappear as the king enters with Taxis, welcomed by a cantata from the farmers. Pausole sings an air of the legend of the ‘Coupe de Thulé’, then goes off to visit the model farm. Giglio, trying to seduce Thierette, spies Aline and Mirabelle through the key-hole, noting that Mirabelle is not a man. He sends Thierette away, and, in order not to frighten the couple, dresses himself in a peasant's dress, and blackmails them into letting him join their fun. Aline decides that she prefers Giglio's kisses to Mirabelle's and all reveal their true identities. Giglio begins to interest Mirabelle and he agrees to help both Aline and Mirabelle escape. Pausole comes back and falls asleep. Aline finds him and leaves message to reassure him that she is fine. Diane à la Houppe and the harem enter and proclaim that revolt has broken out in the harem. This gives the king the chance to express his wish for peace, in which ‘national anthem’ all join.

=== Act III ===
At the inn of the ‘Sein blanc et de Westphalie réunis’
After a chorus of soubrettes, Giglio emerges from the king's bedroom, where, in place of the king, the page has had a night of ecstasy with Diane. Aline and Mirabelle are in the same hôtel. The king's daughter is yearning for the young page. Amid comings and goings from the different hotel rooms, there follow the entry of the Spanish chocolate, an air for Taxis, and a telephone duet. Giglio persuades Aline of the advantages of a man making love to a woman, and after Pausole has read a speech on free love, Giglio feels free to make off with Aline. Pausole discovers Aline and Giglio in his bedroom. The king abdicates, and goes off to sleep, to a gentle final chorus.

== Recording ==
Christine Barbaux (La Blanche Aline), Brigitte Fournier (Thiérette), Rachel Yakar (Diane), Bernadette Antoine (Mirabelle), Michel Sénéchal (Taxis), Reinaldo Macias (Giglio), Gabriel Bacquier (Le Roi Pausole), Charles Ossola (Le Métayer), Atelier Philharmonique Suisse, Madrigalistes de Bâle. conducted by Mario Venzago. MGB CD 6115 (two CDs).
