= The Rebel Son =

- Opening_titles
- Directed by: Adrian Brunel; Albert de Courville; Aleksey Granovsky
- Written by: Adrian Brunel (screenplay); Nikolai Gogol (original story)
- Produced by: Charles David; E.C. Molinier
- Starring: Roger Livesey; Bernard Miles; Harry Baur; Anthony Bushell; Patricia Roc
- Cinematography: Bernard Browne; Franz Planer
- Edited by: Lionel Hoare; William Hornbeck; Pat Wooley
- Music by: Stock music by Arthur Benjamin and Ernst Toch
- Production company: London Films
- Distributed by: United Artists
- Release date: 1938
- Running time: 92 minutes
- Country: United Kingdom
- Language: English

The Rebel Son (also known as The Barbarian and the Lady and The Rebel Son of Taras Bulba) is a 1938 British historical adventure film directed by Adrian Brunel and starring Harry Baur, Anthony Bushell and Roger Livesey. Patricia Roc also appears in her first screen role. It is a re-working of Aleksey Granovsky's 1936 French film adaptation of the 1835 Russian novel Taras Bulba by Nikolai Gogol, set in the 17th century Ukraine.

== Cast ==
- Harry Baur as Taras Bulba
- Anthony Bushell as Andrei Bulba
- Roger Livesey as Peter Bulba
- Patricia Roc as Marina
- Joan Gardner as Galka
- Frederick Culley as Prince Zammitsky
- Bernard Miles as Polish prisoner
- Joe Cunningham as Sachka
- Charles Farrell as Tovkatch
- Stafford Hilliard as Stutterer
- Ann Wemyss as Selima

== Reception ==
The Daily Film Renter wrote: "Spectacular conflict scenes pack main entertainment punch, but development is boring, acting melodramatic, and situations are ultra-theatrical. Offering for not too critical Patrons."

Kine Weekly wrote: "It lacks conviction largely because it is a mixture of English production and interpolated sequences from an original French film, and there is some rather too obvious dubbing of voices. The picture's main assets are colourful pageantry and large-scale battle sequences. The late Harry Baur does well as a Cossack warrior who has two sons fighting on opposite sides in the conflict."

Picturegoer wrote: "Made originally in French, this English version contains some of the spectacular sequences from the original and these are the best part of the picture. Harry Baur is good as a Cossack warrior with two sons, one of whom sympathizes with the Poles and is shot by his father. Neither Anthony Bushell nor Roger Livesey are happy in the roles of the Cossack's sons and the distaff side, too, has to fight at long odds to bring conviction to their parts. There seems little rhyme or reason for the plot except to introduce vast battle sequences."
