= Machine Heart =

Machine Heart may refer to:

- Machine Heart, label Arthur Loves Plastic discography
- "Machine Heart", song by Gary Numan from The Radial Pair: Video Soundtrack
- "Machine Heart", song by Kelsea Ballerini from Unapologetically
