= Queen of the World =

Queen of the World is a title of Mary, mother of Jesus, see Queen of Heaven

Queen of the World may also refer to:

- "Queen of the World", a song by Arthur Loves Plastic from Savage Bliss
- "Queen of the World", a song by the Bottle Rockets from The Brooklyn Side
- "Queen of the World", a song by Ida Maria from Fortress Round My Heart
- "Queen of the World", a song by the Jayhawks from Smile
- "Queen of the World", a song by Kelli Ali from Tigermouth
- "Queen of the World", a song by Tina Cousins from Mastermind
- Babymouse: Queen of the World, a book from the Babymouse series by Jennifer L. Holm
