= Jeanne Mammen =

German painter

- Jeanne Mammen, 1975
- Born: 21 November 1890; Berlin, Germany
- Died: 22 April 1976 (aged 85)
- Known for: Painting, lithography
- Movement: New Objectivity, Cubism, Symbolism

Jeanne Mammen (21 November 1890 – 22 April 1976) was a German painter, illustrator, and printmaker. Her work is associated with the New Objectivity, Symbolism, and Cubism movements. She is best known for her depictions of queer women and Berlin city life during the Weimar period.

== Biography ==
=== Early life ===
Jeanne Mammen was born in Berlin, the daughter of a successful German merchant. She and her family moved to Paris when she was five years old. She started her studies at Académie Julian, one of few art schools at the time that taught women with the same rigor as men. When her family relocated to Brussels, she studied at The Royal Academy of Fine Arts in 1908. Her early work, influenced by Symbolism, Art Nouveau, and the Decadent movement, was exhibited in Brussels and Paris in 1912 and 1913.

In 1916 Mammen and her family fled Paris to avoid internment during World War I. While her parents moved to Amsterdam, Mammen chose instead to return to Berlin. She was now financially on her own for the first time, as the French government had confiscated all of her family's property. For several years Mammen struggled to make ends meet, taking any work she could find, and spending time with people from different class backgrounds. These experiences and newfound sympathies are reflected in her artwork from the period.

=== Weimar Period ===
In time Mammen was able to find work as a commercial artist, producing fashion plates, movie posters, and caricatures for satirical journals such as Simplicissimus, Ulk, and Jugend. In the mid-1920s she became known for her illustrations evoking the urban atmosphere of Berlin. Much of her artwork depicted women. These women subjects often included haughty socialites, fashionable middle-class shop girls, street singers, and prostitutes. Her drawings were often compared to those of George Grosz and Otto Dix. Throughout the late 1920s and early 1930s she worked mainly in pencil with watercolor washes, and in pen and ink.

In 1921, Mammen moved into an apartment with her sister in Berlin. This apartment was a former photographer's studio which she lived in until her death. Throughout her life, Mammen was also interested in science. She was close friends with Max Delbrück, who left Europe, took some of her artworks with him, and exhibited them in California. He also sent Mammen care packages from the United States with art supplies.

In 1930 she had a major exhibition in the Fritz Gurlitt gallery. Over the next two years, at Gurlitt's suggestion, she created a series of eight lithographs illustrating Les Chansons de Bilitis, a collection of lesbian love poems by Pierre Louÿs.

=== World War II ===
In 1933, following Mammen's inclusion in an exhibition of female artists in Berlin, the Nazi authorities denounced her motifs and subjects as "Jewish", and banned her lithographs for Les Chansons de Bilitis. The Nazis also opposed her blatant disregard for 'appropriate' female submissiveness in the expressions of her subjects as well as the lesbian imagery found in many of her works. The Nazis shut down most of the journals she had worked for, and she refused to work for those that complied with their cultural policies.

Until the end of the war she practiced "inner emigration". She stopped exhibiting her work and focused on advertising. For a time she also peddled second-hand books from a handcart. In the 1940s, in a show of solidarity, Mammen began experimenting with Cubism and expressionism, a risky move given the Nazis' condemnation of abstract art as "degenerate". During this, Mammen, an avid reader of modernist literature, also started her translation of Arthur Rimbaud's Illuminations.

=== Postwar and later years ===
After the war she took to collecting wires, string, and other materials from the streets of bombed-out Berlin to create reliefs. In the late 1940s she began exhibiting her work again, as well as designing sets for the Die Badewanne cabaret. She created abstract collages from various materials, including candy wrappers. In the 1950s she adopted a new style, combining thick layers of oil paint with a few fine marks on the surface.

== Style and methods ==
She worked in a variety of mediums, including watercolor, oil, lithography, and sculpture but is most known for her Weimar period (1919–33) works in watercolor and graphite. Her style during this time was characterized by "a simplified, elegant line with a wash of color added later [which] made her popular among high-circulation magazines and journals".

During this time, she was a part of the New Objectivity movement, in which artists attempted to reconcile with a post-WWI Germany by looking at societal issues with "meticulous detail and violent satire". Under the Nazi regime, she experimented in secret with Cubism and Expressionism to rebel against the government's banning of "degenerate" art. She was particularly inspired by Picasso and his Guernica.

== Themes ==
Mammen's works focused largely on female subjects and female relationships, both platonic and romantic. Many of her female subjects displayed characteristics of the "New Woman'' of 1920's Berlin - fashionable, independent, and relatively sexually liberated. In her Weimar period illustrations and watercolors, she "addressed the changing roles of women. From the vamp, the naive and young, to the bourgeois and the intellectual, she depicted the complexities of being a New Woman struggling with emerging roles."

Many of her works also centered around homosexuality and challenging traditional gender roles. She included 14 of her illustrations in Curt Moreck's Guide to Depraved Berlin, published in 1931, a guide to the lesbian and gay scene in Berlin. Her contributions depicted prostitutes, women-only nightclubs, and bars of the city. She also provided illustrations for Les Chansons de Bilitis, a collection of lesbian love poems. According to Lydia Bohmert, in contrast with her contemporaries, Mammen "viewed the homosexual subculture with understanding".

== Legacy ==
=== Exhibitions ===
In the 1970s there was a resurgence of interest in Mammen's early work as German art historians and art historians of the women's movement rediscovered her paintings and illustrations from the Weimar period. In 2010 the Des Moines Art Center exhibited 13 watercolor paintings done by Mammen which were inspired by Berlin in the Weimar era. In 2013 her later, more abstract work, was featured in "Painting Forever!", a large-scale exhibition held during Berlin Art Week.

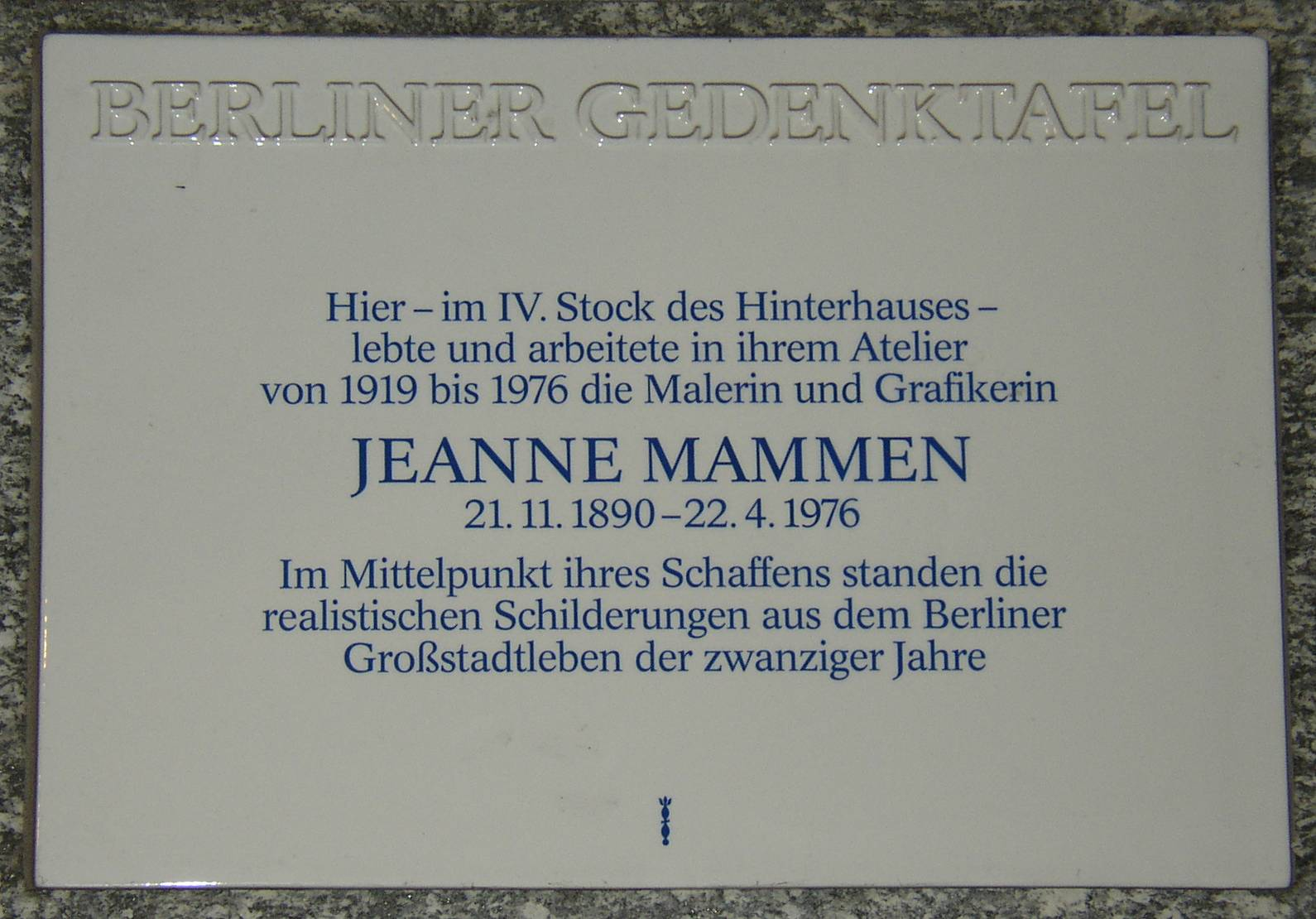
Memorial plaque at Mammen's studio apartment. Translation: " Here—on the fourth floor of the rear building— the painter and graphic artist JEANNE MAMMEN 21 Nov. 1890 – 22 April 1976 lived and worked in her studio from 1919 to 1976. Her work focused on realistic depictions of big-city life in 1920s Berlin."

The Berlinische Galerie mounted a major exhibition of Mammen's work in 2017-2018, titled, "Jeanne Mammen: Die Beobachterin: Retrospektive 1910–1975" (Jeanne Mammen: The Observer: Retrospective 1910–1975), which included more than 170 works in various media, covering the period from the 1920s to her later work post-1960s. The show was an update to the Galerie's 1997 show at the Martin Gropius Bau, which featured primarily works from the 1920s.

=== Foundation and Jeanne Mammen Apartment Museum ===
The Jeanne Mammen Foundation created a museum of Jeanne's studio apartment at Kurfürstendamm 29, which she lived and worked in for over 50 years. Since the foundation's dissolution in 2018, the Stadtmuseum Berlin runs the museum.

== Quote ==
- "I always wished to be just a pair of eyes, to explore the world without being seen, only to see others." — Jeanne Mammen

== Public collections ==
- Berlinische Galerie
- Harvard Art Museums
- Des Moines Art Center
- Museum of Modern Art
- Metropolitan Museum of Art
- Morgan Library & Museum

== Bibliography ==
- Förderverein der Jeanne-Mammen-Stiftung e. V., Jeanne Mammen: Paris Bruxelles Berlin, Berlinische Galerie Berlin, 2017
- Harrity, Christopher. "Artist Spotlight on Jeanne Mammen". Advocate.com.
- Sykora, Katharina (Autumn 1988). "Jeanne Mammen". Woman's Art Journal. 9 (2). Woman's Art Inc.: 28–31. doi:10.2307/1358317. JSTOR 1358317.
