= Teflon John =

Teflon John may refer to:

- John Key (born 1961), New Zealand politician and former prime minister; nicknamed "Teflon John"
- John Ibrahim (born 1970), Australian alleged organized crime figure; nicknamed "Teflon John"
- John Saldivar (politician), Belizean politician; nicknamed "Teflon John"

== See also ==
- John Gotti (1940–2002), American mafia leader; nicknamed "Teflon Don"
- Teflon Don (disambiguation)
- Teflon (disambiguation)
- John (disambiguation)
