= Roman Maciejewski =

Polish composer

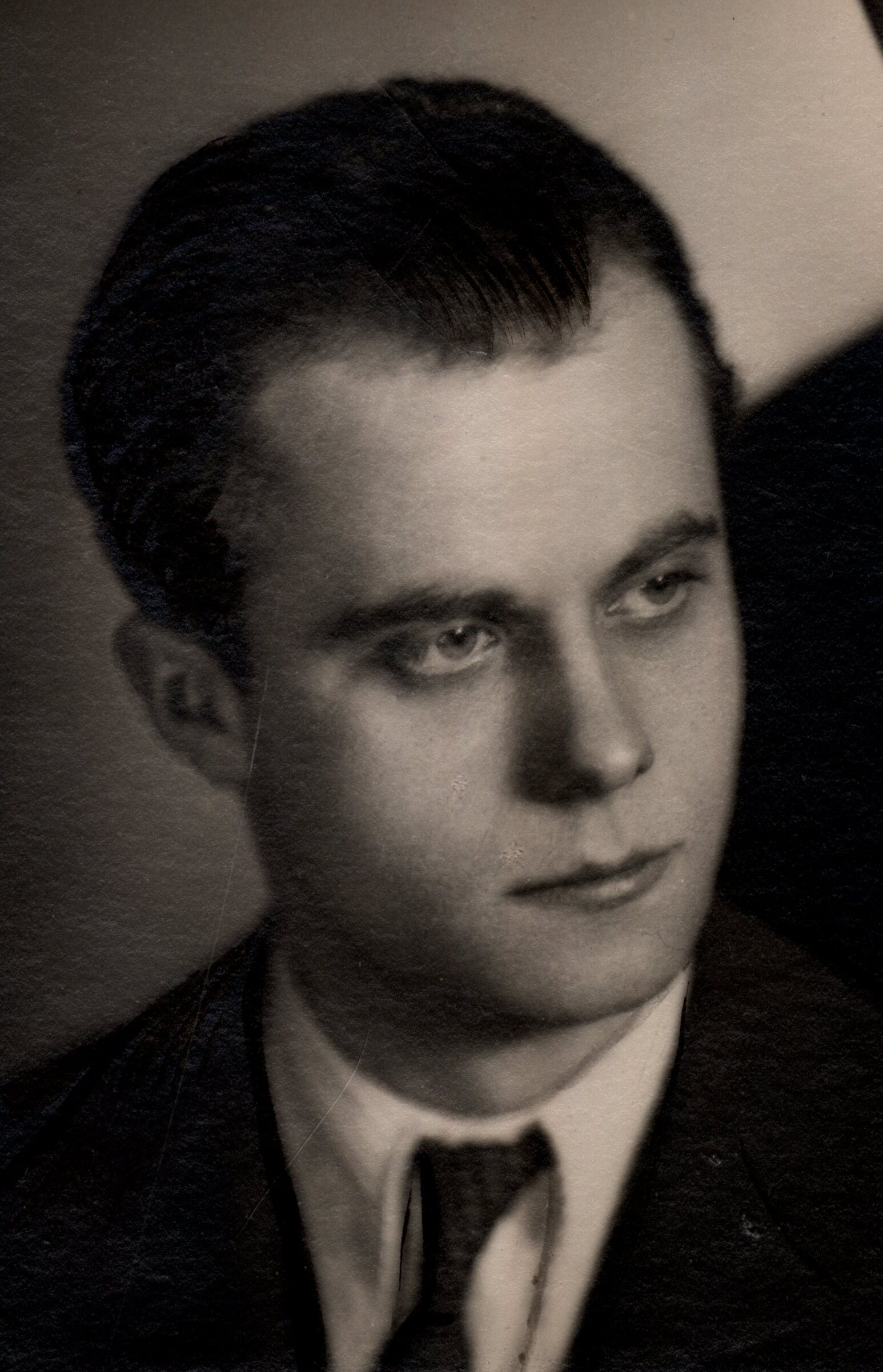
Roman Maciejewski

Roman Maciejewski (28 February 1910 in Berlin, Germany – 30 April 1998 in Gothenburg, Sweden) was a Polish composer. His mother, Bronisława Maciejewska, was a talented violinist and music teacher who taught him to play piano.

He studied in Stern Conservatory in Berlin, later with Stanisław Wiechowicz and Kazimierz Sikorski in Poznań Conservatory, then continued with Sikorski in Warsaw Conservatory. In his early years he was highly acclaimed by Karol Szymanowski. In 1934 he went to Paris, to study with Nadia Boulanger. He never returned to his native Poland, staying in various countries abroad: France (till 1938), United Kingdom (1938-1939), Sweden (1939-1951), United States (1951-1977) and again Sweden (1977–98).

At first he composed inspired by Karol Szymanowski's late style (mazurkas for piano, Kurpian Songs for choir). The tragedy of World War II, and also his very serious illness during his first stay in Sweden, caused a deep change in composer's personality, that has greatly affected his music.

Starting in 1939 Maciejewski began living in Sweden, working as a composer and pianist, where he married a Swedish dancer and remained for 12 years. He composed music for several theatre productions of Ingmar Bergman, including Camus's Kaligula. While in Sweden, he began his life-work, the Missa pro defunctis, which he finished fifteen years later. This monumental piece is dedicated to all the victims of all wars and remains Maciejewski's best known and highest-regarded composition. It was premiered during the International Festival of Conterporary Music in Warsaw in 1960. After World War II (in 1951), Maciejewski moved to the United States and spent a period of 26 years in California, living in Redondo Beach, working as the organist for two Catholic churches, and directing the "Roman Choir" which yearly toured the missions and cathedrals of California. During his American years, Maciejewski composed a number of choral pieces and masses. In 1977 Maciejewski moved back to Sweden, settling in Göteborg where he died on 30 April 1998. He is buried in his home town of Leszno, Poland.

== Works ==
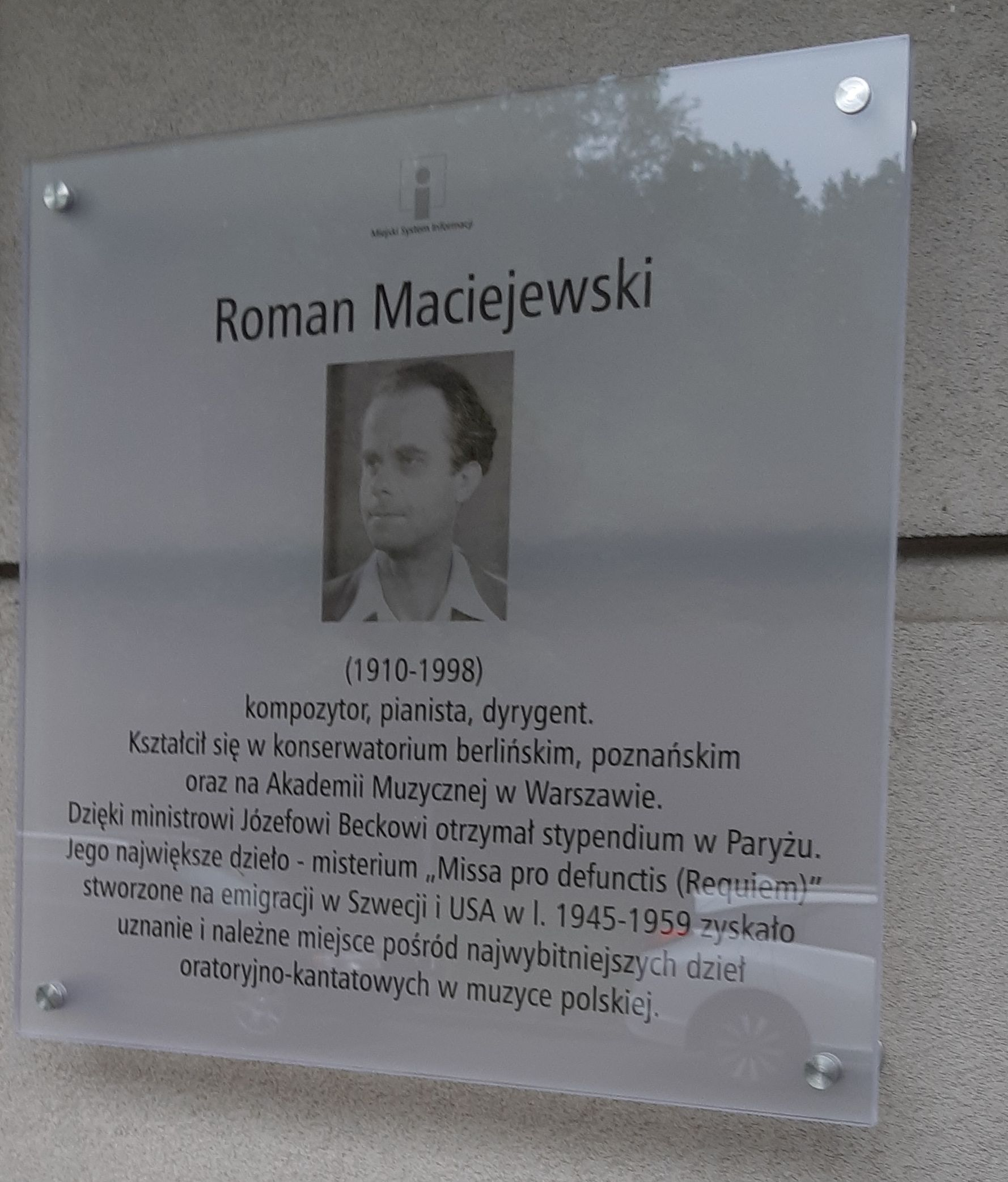
Plaque to Maciejewski in Warsaw

- app. 60 Mazurkas for piano
- Kurpian Songs - for choir a cappella (1929)
- The Songs of Bilitis (words by Pierre Louÿs, trans. by Leopold Staff) - for soprano & orch. (1935)
- Concerto for 2 pianos (1936)
- Berceuse and Allegro concertante - for piano & orch. (1944)
- Missa pro defunctis. Requiem - for 4 solo voices, choir & orch. (1945–59)
- Nocturne - for flute, celesta & guitar (1952)
- Missa brevis - for choir & organ (1964)
- Mass of the Resurrection - for choir & organ (1966)
- Also chamber, piano and other pieces; theatrical music for the plays directed by Ingmar Bergman
