= Second of the month =

Recurring ordinal calendar date

The second of the month or second day of the month is the recurring calendar date position corresponding to the day numbered 2 of each month. In the Gregorian calendar (and other calendars that number days sequentially within a month), this day occurs in every month of the year, and therefore occurs twelve times per year.

- Second of January
- Second of February
- Second of March
- Second of April
- Second of May
- Second of June
- Second of July
- Second of August
- Second of September
- Second of October
- Second of November
- Second of December

In addition to these dates, this date occurs in months of many other calendars, such as the Bengali calendar and the Hebrew calendar.

== See also ==
- Second (disambiguation)
