= Second Avenue =

2nd Avenue, Second Avenue or 2 Av may refer to:

== Places (including transport stations) ==
- 2nd Avenue & Abilene station, a light rail station in Aurora, Colorado, U.S.
- 2nd Avenue Lofts, a historic building in the Central Business District, Saskatoon, Saskatchewan, Canada
- Second Avenue Deli, kosher delicatessen in Manhattan, NY, U.S.
- Irving and 2nd Avenue station, a light rail stop in San Francisco, U.S.
- Second Avenue (IND Sixth Avenue Line), a station on the New York City Subway

=== Roads and transportation ===
- 2nd Avenue, an arterial road in Whitehorse, Yukon, Canada
- M15 (New York City bus), a bus route in Manhattan that runs on First and Second Avenue
- Second Avenue, a neighborhood of Albany, New York, U.S.
- Second Avenue (IND Sixth Avenue Line), a New York City Subway station
- Second Avenue (Brooklyn), a street in Brooklyn, U.S.
- Second Avenue (Manhattan), a street in New York, U.S.
- Second Avenue (Nashville, Tennessee), site of a Christmas Day 2020 explosion
- Second Avenue (Pittsburgh), a street in Pittsburgh, PA, U.S.
- Second Avenue Subway, or IND Second Avenue Line, a line in the New York City Subway

==== Defunct roads and transportation ====
- IRT Second Avenue Line, or Second Avenue El, a former elevated railway
- Second Avenue Railroad, a former street railway company

== Arts, entertainment, and media ==
- 2nd Avenue (album), by No Justice, 2010
- Second Avenue (album), by Lisa Moscatiello, 2000
- "Second Avenue" (song), a 1974 song written by Tim Moore and recorded by Art Garfunkel
- 2nd Avenue (TV channel), a defunct television network in the Philippines
- On Second Avenue, a Yiddish American musical theatre production

== Other uses ==
- 2 Av, the second day of Av, the fifth month of the Hebrew calendar

== See also ==
- 2nd Street (disambiguation)
