= Taras Bulba (1936 film) =

- French: Tarass Boulba
- Directed by: Alexis Granowsky
- Written by: Pierre Benoît; Fritz Falkenstein; Jacques Natanson; Carlo Rim
- Based on: Taras Bulba (1835 novel) by Nikolai Gogol
- Starring: Harry Baur; Jean-Pierre Aumont; Danielle Darrieux
- Cinematography: Jean Bachelet; Louis Née; Franz Planer
- Edited by: Jacques Saint-Léonard
- Music by: Paul Dessau; Joe Hajos
- Production company: GG Films
- Distributed by: Societé d'Exploitation et de Distribution de Films
- Release date: 5 March 1936
- Running time: 86 minutes
- Country: France
- Language: French

Taras Bulba (French: Tarass Boulba) is a 1936 French historical drama film directed by Alexis Granowsky and starring Harry Baur, Jean-Pierre Aumont and Danielle Darrieux. It is based on Nikolai Gogol's 1835 novel.

Many of the film's production team were White émigrés, who had left following the Russian Revolution. The film's sets were designed by the art directors Lucien Aguettand and Andrej Andrejew. The costumes were designed by Georges Annenkov.

== Cast ==
- Harry Baur as Taras Bulba
- Jean-Pierre Aumont as André Bulba
- Danielle Darrieux as Marina
- Pierre Larquey as Sashka
- Janine Crispin as Galka
- Roger Duchesne as Ostap Bulba
- Fernand Ledoux as Tovkatch
- Georges Paulais as Ibrahim
- Paul Amiot as Prince Zamnitzky
- Pauline Carton as The Governess
- Nane Germon as Zelma

== British remake ==
The rights to the film were bought by Alexander Korda who remade it in Britain with Baur as The Rebel Son (1938).
