= 2nd Street =

2nd Street or Second Street may refer to:

== Places ==
=== Hong Kong ===
- Second Street (Hong Kong), a road in Sai Ying Pun area

=== Singapore ===
- Second Street, a road in Siglap

=== United States ===
- 2nd Street (Augusta), Georgia
- 2nd Street (Manhattan), New York City
- 2nd Street (Los Angeles), California
  - Second Street Cable Railway
  - 2nd Street Tunnel
- 2nd Street (St. Louis), Missouri
- 2nd Street (Washington, D.C.)
- Second Street District, in Austin, Texas
- 2nd Street School, a historic former school in Trenton, New Jersey

== Other uses ==
- 2nd Street (album), by Back Street Crawler, 1976
- Gandhinagar 2nd Street, a 1986 Indian Malayalam-language comedy drama film

== See also ==
- Second Street Bridge (disambiguation)
- Second Street Historic District (disambiguation)
- 2nd Street station (disambiguation)
- 2nd Avenue (disambiguation)
