= Second Avenue (album) =

Studio album by Lisa Moscatiello
- Released: May 30, 2000
- Genre: Folk
- Label: Wind River Records
- Producer: Marco Delmar

Lisa Moscatiello chronology
| Innocent When You Dream (1997) | Second Avenue (2000) | What Happens After Love (2002) |

Alternative cover
- 2002 Machine Heart Music release

Professional ratings
Review scores
| Source | Rating |
|---|---|
| Allmusic | 4/5 stars |

Second Avenue is the second solo album from Lisa Moscatiello and was released in 2000.

Lisa Moscatiello's frequent collaborator Bev Stanton released an electronic deconstruction of Second Avenue in 2000 entitled Second Avenue Detour.

== Awards ==
Second Avenue won the 2000 Album of the Year Wammie, as well as the Wammie for Best Recording in the Contemporary Folk category.

== Release notes ==
"Lisa Moscatiello's rich and deep alto voice is the magical thread binding together Second Avenue. The shimmering arrangements featuring fiddle, bouzouki, and harp alongside acoustic, electric, and slide guitar reflect Lisa's background in Celtic music."

== Reissue ==
In 2002 Second Avenue was reissued on the Machine Heart Music label with a different running order and two extra tracks - "Little Maggie" and "In the Here and Now".

== Track listing ==
=== 2000 Wind River release ===
| No. | Title | Writer(s) | Length |
|---|---|---|---|
| 1. | "Fugitive" | Lisa Moscatiello/Bev Stanton | 3:12 |
| 2. | "Second Avenue" | Dave Chappell/Moscatiello | 3:27 |
| 3. | "Cards on the Table" | Mary Byrd Brown | 3:18 |
| 4. | "To Meet You" | Carla Sciaky | 3:11 |
| 5. | "Biloxi" | Jesse Winchester | 3:48 |
| 6. | "Throw It Away" | Abbey Lincoln | 4:13 |
| 7. | "Bed by the Window" | Moscatiello | 2:43 |
| 8. | "Lass of Glenshee" | Traditional | 4:51 |
| 9. | "Love Is a Stranger" | Annie Lennox/Dave Stewart | 3:54 |
| 10. | "Angry Town" | Moscatiello | 3:31 |
| 11. | "Sleepin' Late" | Fangette Willett | 3:36 |
| 12. | "Night Bird" | Moscatiello | 3:26 |

=== 2002 Machine Heart Music reissue ===
| No. | Title | Writer(s) | Length |
|---|---|---|---|
| 1. | "To Meet You" | Carla Sciaky | 3:13 |
| 2. | "Second Avenue" | Dave Chappell/Lisa Moscatiello | 3:24 |
| 3. | "Biloxi" | Jesse Winchester | 3:50 |
| 4. | "Fugitive" | Lisa Moscatiello/Bev Stanton | 3:13 |
| 5. | "Cards on the Table" | Mary Byrd Brown | 3:17 |
| 6. | "Throw It Away" | Abbey Lincoln | 4:13 |
| 7. | "Bed by the Window" | Moscatiello | 2:42 |
| 8. | "Lass of Glenshee" | Traditional | 4:50 |
| 9. | "Little Maggie" | Traditional | 3:51 |
| 10. | "Love Is a Stranger" | Annie Lennox/Dave Stewart | 3:55 |
| 11. | "Angry Town" | Moscatiello | 3:34 |
| 12. | "Night Bird" | Moscatiello | 3:23 |
| 13. | "Sleepin' Late" | Fangette Willett | 3:38 |
| 14. | "In the Here and Now" | | 3:38 |
