= Segundo =

Segundo is a Portuguese and Spanish word meaning "second" and may refer to:

== Music ==
- Segundo (Juana Molina album), 2000
- Segundo (Cooder Graw album), 2001

== Places ==
- Segundo, Colorado, an unincorporated community of Colorado
- Segundo, Ponce, Puerto Rico, a barrio in the municipio of Ponce, Puerto Rico
- Segundo River, a river in Cordoba, Argentina

== Other ==
- Walter Gavitt Ferguson (1919–2023), Costa Rican calypso musician sometimes referred to by the nickname ”Segundo”
- Juan Luis Segundo (1925–1996), Uruguayan theologian and Jesuit priest
- USS Segundo (SS-398), a United States submarine in commission from 1944 to 1970

== See also ==
- Second (disambiguation)
