= Six épigraphes antiques =

Suite of six pieces by Claude Debussy

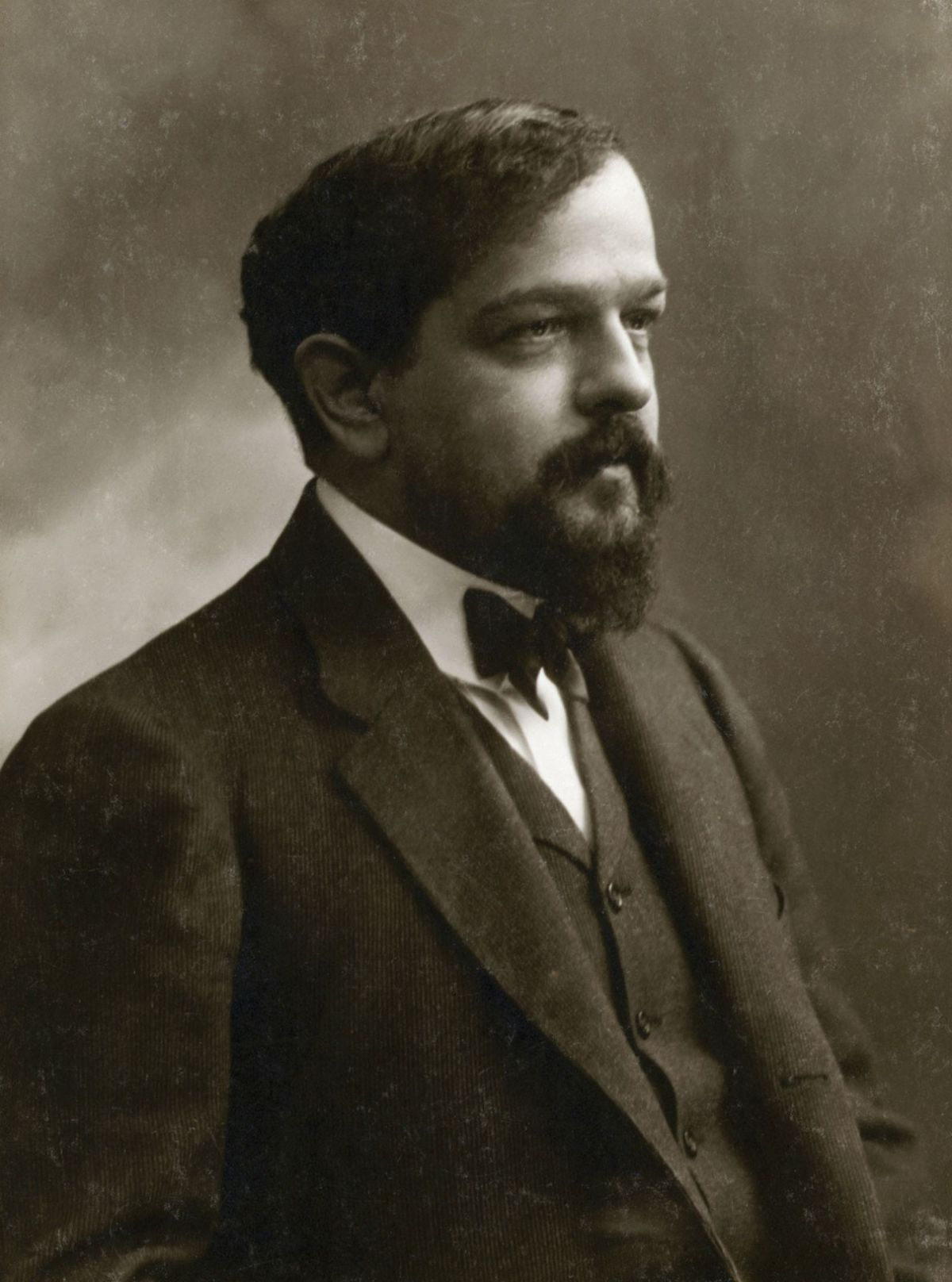
Claude Debussy ca. 1908

Six épigraphes antiques, L. 131, CD. 139, is a suite of six pieces by Claude Debussy, originally written for piano duo. Completed in July 1914, the suite was Debussy's only completed composition that year. In 1915, Debussy transcribed them for piano solo. Much of the music (over 100 measures) is taken from the musical accompaniments he had written in 1901 for his friend Pierre Louÿs's erotic lesbian poems Les Chansons de Bilitis. In 1939, the Swiss conductor Ernest Ansermet created an orchestration of the suite.

Movements:

1. Pour invoquer Pan, dieu du vent d'été ("To invoke Pan, god of the summer wind")
2. Pour un tombeau sans nom ("For a nameless tomb")
3. Pour que la nuit soit propice ("In order that the night be propitious")
4. Pour la danseuse aux crotales ("For the dancer with crotales")
5. Pour l'égyptienne ("For the Egyptian woman")
6. Pour remercier la pluie au matin ("To thank the morning rain")

== Recordings ==
The work has been recorded by Walter Gieseking, Robert and Gaby Casadesus Alain Planès andNoriko Ogawa, among others.

== See also ==
- Astilla, Christopher. "Between the Staves" – Adaptations of Debussy's "Six Epigraphes Antiques" and Creative Tasks of the Performer. ISBN 9780549458920.
- List of compositions by Claude Debussy
