= Trois Filles de leur mère =

Erotic novel by Pierre Louÿs

- Title page of a 1936 edition
- Author: Pierre Louÿs
- Language: French
- Published: 1926

Trois Filles de leur mère (lit. 'Three Daughters of their Mother') is a French erotic novel by Pierre Louÿs, first published in 1926.

== Synopsis ==
In the "Notice to the reader", the author purports to represent a true account: "This little book is not a novel. It's a true story down to the smallest detail. I haven't changed anything, neither the portrait of the mother and the three young girls, nor their ages, nor the circumstances".

The author presents the sexual adventures of a young man of twenty, "X***", to whom a prostitute of thirty-six, Teresa, and her three daughters, Charlotte, twenty, Mauricette, fourteen and a half, and Lili, ten years old, take turns visiting, before they all engage in a big staging of obscene games.

== History ==
Pierre Louÿs wrote Trois Filles de leur mère in around 1910, although it was first published, posthumously, in 1926. The work was translated into English for the Ophelia Press as The She-Devils (1965), where the author is called "Peter Lewys" (i.e. Pierre Louÿs). It was translated by "S. d'E" for the Grove Press as Mother's Three Daughters (1969).

== Appraisal ==
Jean d'Ormesson, when asked of his interest in genre literature in an interview for Le Figaro, replied: "I like detective novels, but I prefer naughty books. I really like Pierre Louÿs. Trois Filles de leur mère is amazing. It's pornographic, but high level!" Annie Le Brun has called it "one of the most moving books ever written on the fatality of desires".

== Sources ==
- Le Brun, Annie (2011). Ailleurs et autrement. Collection Arcades N^{o} 100. Gallimard. p. 23.
- Thomas, Donald (1969). A Long Time Burning: The History of Literary Censorship in England. New York and Washington: Frederick A. Praeger. p. 307n.
- Ungemuth, Nicolas (5 December 2017). "Jean d'Ormesson: «J'ai écrit mon premier roman pour plaire à une fille»". Le Figaro. Retrieved 13 November 2022.
