= Love or Perish =

Studio album by Arthur Loves Plastic
- Released: January 2005
- Genre: Electronica
- Length: 43:58
- Label: Machine Heart Music
- Producer: Bev Stanton

Arthur Loves Plastic album chronology
Savage Bliss (2004)	Love or Perish (2005)	Pursuit of Happiness (2006)

Professional ratings
Review scores
Source	Rating
Church of Girl	favorable
Collected Sounds	favorable
Dead Earnest	favorable
God Is in the TV Zine	favorable
ReVamp Music	favorable

Love or Perish is the twelfth album from Arthur Loves Plastic and was released in 2005.

== Release notes ==
"It's a jungle out there!" features remixes of The Tidbits and Michelle Swan, as well as vocals by Lisa Moscatiello and Heather Heimbuch.

== Track listing ==
All tracks are written by Bev Stanton, except where noted.

No.	Title	Length
1.	"New Year's"	3:37
2.	"Breakdown"	2:42
3.	"Hot for You"	3:01
4.	"Danger"	2:41
5.	"Vibrations"	1:43
6.	"My Heart"	2:58
7.	"Lover"	3:41
8.	"Eternity"	4:31
9.	"I am a Clone (I am a Clown)" (Gltch Btch remixed by ALP)	3:34
10.	"Ravish"	2:46
11.	"Trampoline"	3:59
12.	"The Cage" (The Tidbits remixed by ALP)	3:38
13.	"Swan Song" (Michelle Swan remixed by ALP)	5:07
Total length:		43:58

Vocals for the track "My Heart" recorded live at 49 West, Annapolis, Maryland.

== Personnel ==
- Recorded by Bev Stanton in the Flamingo Room, Silver Spring, MD.

=== Additional musicians ===
- Lisa Moscatiello - Vocals (1, 6, 8, 11)
- Mental Anguish - Loops (2, 10) ^{*}
- Electroearwig - Loops (3) ^{*}
- Scott Carr - Loops (4) ^{*}
- Francine Machetto - Vocals (7)
- Omnitechnomatrix - Loops (8) ^{*}
- Heather Heimbuch - Vocals (10)
- Heather Heimbuch - Additional vocals (13)

^{*} Remixed for The Tapegerm Collective
