= Second Street Bridge =

Second Street Bridge may refer to:

- Second Street Bridge (Little Rock, Arkansas)
- Second Street Bridge (Louisville, Kentucky) officially the George Rogers Clark Memorial Bridge, crosses between Louisville, Kentucky and Jeffersonville/Clarksville, Indiana
- Second Street Bridge (Allegan, Michigan) listed on the National Register of Historic Places (NRHP)
- Second Street Bridge (Chester, Pennsylvania), NRHP-listed
- Second Street Bridge (Galesville, Wisconsin), formerly listed on the National Register of Historic Places listings in Trempealeau County, Wisconsin

== See also ==
- Second Street–Gun River Bridge, Hooper, Michigan, NRHP-listed
- West Second Street–Swartz Creek Bridge, Flint, Michigan, NRHP-listed
