= Thomas Rogers (writer) =

American novelist and academic (1927–2007)

- Born: June 23, 1927; Chicago, Illinois, U.S.
- Died: April 1, 2007 (aged 79)
- Education: Harvard University; University of Iowa (PhD)
- Occupations: Novelist, academic

Thomas Rogers (June 23, 1927 – April 1, 2007) was an American novelist and academic.

== Early life and education ==
Born in Chicago, Illinois, Rogers graduated from Harvard University in Cambridge, Massachusetts, in 1950 before earning a master's degree and a PhD from the University of Iowa in Iowa City, Iowa.

== Career ==
He was twice nominated for the National Book Award for Fiction – for his first novel, The Pursuit of Happiness (1968), which was adapted into a 1971 film of the same name, and his second novel, The Confessions of a Child of the Century by Samuel Heather (1972). His final two novels were both centered on the same protagonist.

Before his retirement in 1992, he taught at Pennsylvania State University in State College, Pennsylvania, for three decades and lived in State College.

== Novels ==
- The Pursuit of Happiness (1968)
- The Confessions of a Child of the Century by Samuel Heather (1972)
- At the Shores (1980)
- Jerry Engels (2005)

== See also ==
- List of American novelists
- List of people from Chicago
- List of people from Pennsylvania
