= Pierre Louÿs =

Belgian writer and poet (1870–1925)

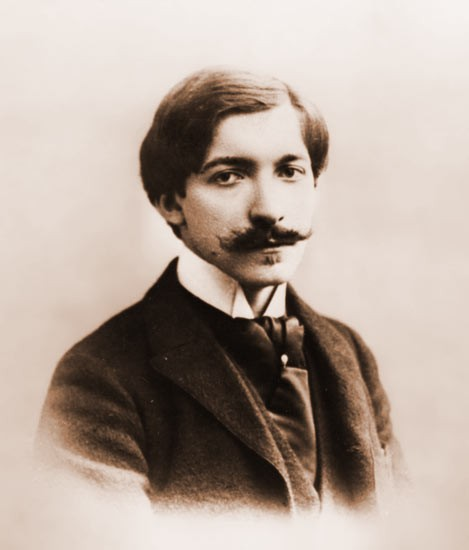
- Louÿs, c. 1890–1900
- Born: Pierre-Félix Louis; 10 December 1870; Ghent, Belgium
- Died: 4 June 1925 (aged 54); Paris, France
- Resting place: Montparnasse Cemetery
- Occupations: novelist, poet
- Writing career
- Pen name: Pierre Chrysis, Peter Lewys, Chibrac
- Language: French
- Period: 1891–1925
- Genre: Erotic literature
- Notable work: Les Chansons de Bilitis
- Movement: Symbolism

Signature
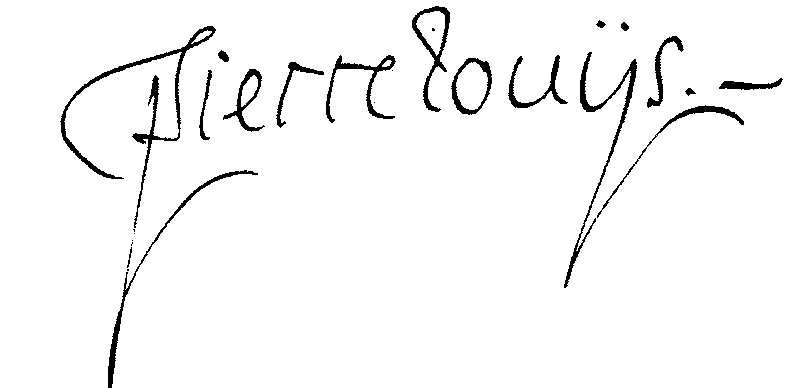

Pierre-Félix Louÿs (French: [pjɛʁ lu.is]; 10 December 1870 – 4 June 1925) was a Belgian poet and writer, most renowned for lesbian and classical themes in some of his writings. He is known as a writer who sought to "express pagan sensuality with stylistic perfection". He was made first a Chevalier and then an Officer of the Légion d'honneur for his contributions to French literature.

== Life ==
Pierre Louÿs was born Pierre Félix Louis on 10 December 1870 in Ghent, Belgium, but relocated to France, where he spent the rest of his life. He studied at the École Alsacienne in Paris, and there he developed a good friendship with a future Nobel Prize winner and champion of homosexual rights André Gide. From 1890 onwards, he began spelling his name as "Louÿs", and pronouncing the final S, as a way of expressing his fondness for classical Greek culture (the letter Y is known in French as i grec or "Greek I"). During the 1890s, he became a friend of the Irish homosexual dramatist Oscar Wilde, and was the dedicatee of Wilde's Salomé in its original (French) edition. Louÿs started writing his first erotic texts at the age of 18, at which time he developed an interest in the Parnassian and Symbolist schools of writing. Louÿs had a long-term romantic relationship with fellow writer Marie de Régnier.

=== Early writings ===
During 1891, Louÿs helped initiate a literary review, La Conque, where he proceeded to publish Astarte, an early collection of erotic verse already marked by his distinctive style. During 1894 he published another erotic collection of 143 prose poems, Songs of Bilitis (Les Chansons de Bilitis), this time with strong lesbian themes. It was divided into three sections, each representative of a phase of Bilitis's life: Bucolics in Pamphylia, Elegies at Mytilene, and Epigrams in the Isle of Cyprus; dedicated to her were also a short Life of Bilitis and three epitaphs in The Tomb of Bilitis. What made The Songs sensational is Louÿs's claim that the poems were the work of an ancient Greek courtesan and contemporary of Sappho, Bilitis; to himself, Louÿs ascribed the modest role of translator. The pretense did not last long, and "translator" Louÿs was soon revealed as Bilitis herself. This did little to discredit The Songs of Bilitis, however, as it was praised for its sensuality and refined style, even more extraordinary for the author's compassionate portrayal of lesbian sexuality.

Some of the poems were intended as songs for voice and piano. Louÿs's friend Claude Debussy composed a musical adaptation of three of the poems as his Chansons de Bilitis (Lesure Number 90) for voice and piano (1897–1898):

- La flûte de Pan: Pour le jour des Hyacinthies
- La chevelure: Il m'a dit «Cette nuit j'ai rêvé»
- Le tombeau des Naiades: Le long du bois couvert de givre.

Debussy also published Six épigraphes antiques during 1914 as piano pieces for four hands, commissioned as preludes to a recital of Louÿs's poems:

- Pour invoquer Pan, dieu du vent d'ete
- Pour un tombeau sans nom
- Pour que la nuit soit propice
- Pour la danseuse aux crotales
- Pour l'egyptienne
- Pour remercier la pluie au matin

During 1955, one of the first lesbian organizations in America named itself Daughters of Bilitis, and to the present Louÿs's Songs continues to be an important work for lesbians.

=== Later writings ===
During 1896, Louÿs published his first novel, Aphrodite – Ancient Manners (Aphrodite – mœurs antiques), a description of courtesan life in Alexandria. It is considered a mixture of both literary excess and refinement, and was the best selling work (at 350,000 copies) by any living French author of the time. Although Debussy claimed exclusive rights to compose an opera based on Aphrodite (and Louÿs said he had to turn down several similar applications), the project never got under way.

Louÿs later published Les Aventures du roi Pausole (The Adventures of King Pausole) in 1901, Pervigilium Mortis in 1916, both of them libertine compositions, and Manuel de civilité pour les petites filles à l'usage des maisons d'éducation, written during 1917 and published posthumously and anonymously in 1927.

Inspired by Abel Lefranc's arguments for the Derbyite theory of Shakespeare authorship, Louÿs proposed in 1919 that the works of Molière were actually written by Corneille.

Even while on his deathbed, Pierre Louÿs continued to write erotic verses.

== Illustrators ==
Many erotic artists have illustrated Louÿs's writings. Some of the most renowned have been John Austen, Georges Barbier, Paul-Émile Bécat, Antoine Calbet, Donald Denton, Beresford Egan, Foujita, Louis Icart, Joseph Kuhn-Régnier, Georges Lepape, Mariette Lydis, Milo Manara, André Edouard Marty, Georges Pichard, Rojan, Marcel Vertès, and Édouard Zier.

One of the best known illustrations for The Songs of Bilitis were done by Willy Pogany in art deco style for a publication circulated privately by Macy-Masius, New York, during 1926.

== List of works ==
- 1891: Astarte.
- 1894: Les Chansons de Bilitis ("The Songs of Bilitis").
  - 1926 The Songs of Bilitis, English translation by Alvah Bessie.
  - 1929: edition including suppressed poems.
  - 1930: Véritables Chansons de Bilitis ("Real Songs of Bilitis", probably not by Pierre Louÿs).
- 1896: Aphrodite: mœurs antiques ("Aphrodite: ancient manners").
  - 1928: edition including suppressed passages (translated into English during 1928 by Whittaker Chambers).
- 1898: La Femme et le pantin ("The Woman and the Puppet").
  - 1908 Woman and Puppet English translation by G. F. Monkshood (pseudonym of William James Clarke ).
- 1901: Les Aventures du roi Pausole ("The adventures of King Pausole").
  - 1929 The Adventures of King Pausole, English translation by Charles Hope Lumley.
- 1903: Sanguines.
- 1906: Archipel ("Archipelago").
- 1916: Pervigilium mortis ("Death watch").
- 1925: Le Crépuscule des nymphes ("The twilight of the nymphs").
- 1925: Quatorze Images ("Fourteen images").

Published posthumously:

- 1926: Manuel de civilité pour les petites filles à l'usage des maisons d'éducation ("Handbook of behaviour for little girls to be used in educational establishments") • 2022 A Handbook of Manners for the Good Girls of France, English translation by Lono Taggers
- 1926: Trois Filles de leur mère ("Three Daughters of their Mother")
  - 1958 The She-Devils (as by "Peter Lewys"), anonymous English translation [by William S. Robinson] published at Paris by the Olympia Press.
  - 1969 Mother's Three Daughters, English translation by Sabine D'Estree (pseudonym of Richard Seaver )
- 1927: Psyché
- 1927: Pages (selected texts)
- 1927: Douze douzains de dialogues ("Twelve dozen dialogues")
- 1927: Histoire du roi Gonzalve et des douze princesses ("Story of King Gonzalve and the twelve princesses")
- 1927: Poésies érotiques ("Erotic poems")
- 1927: Pybrac
- 1927: Trente-deux Quatrains ("Thirty-two quatrains")
- 1933: Au Temps des juges: chants bibliques ("In the time of the Judges: Biblical songs")
- 1933: Contes choisis (selected stories)
- 1938: La Femme ("Woman")
- 1945: Stances et derniers vers ("Stanzas and last verses")
- 1948: Le Trophée de vulves légendaires ("The trophy of legendary vulvas")
- 1949: Cydalise
- 1988: L'Île aux dames ("The island of women")

For recent limited editions of further writings by Pierre Louÿs, see the Scissors-and-Paste bibliography.

== Adaptations ==
- The 1977 movie That Obscure Object of Desire directed by Luis Buñuel is based on La Femme et le Pantin.
- The 1935 movie, The Devil Is a Woman, directed and photographed by Josef von Sternberg, starring Marlene Dietrich, is also based on the novel.
- Songs of Bilitis, play created by Rogue Artists Ensemble and originally commissioned by the Getty Villa adapted by Katie Polebaum with music by Ego Plum. Returning fall 2013 in Los Angeles.
- In 1894 Claude Debussy set three of the poems in Songs of Bilitis to music for voice and piano: La Flûte de Pan, La Chevelure, and Le Tombeau des Naïades.
- Les Aventures du roi Pausole, opérette in three acts with music by Arthur Honegger and libretto by Albert Willemetz, Théâtre des Bouffes-Parisiens on 12 December 1930.
- Aphrodite ('Monodramma di costumi antichi') with music and libretto by Giorgio Battistelli after the novel Aphrodite–mœurs antiques. Premiere: 7 Jul 1988; Villa Massimo, Rome.
- Curiosa, Lou Jeunet's French movie, 2019.
