= Pursuit of Happiness (Arthur Loves Plastic album) =

Studio album by Arthur Loves Plastic
- Released: 5 January 2006
- Genre: Electronica
- Length: 42:10
- Label: Machine Heart Music
- Producer: Bev Stanton

Arthur Loves Plastic album chronology
Love or Perish (2005)	Pursuit of Happiness (2006)	Troubled (2006)

Alternative cover
- Original release album cover

Professional ratings
Review scores
Source	Rating
Church of Girl	favorable
Collected Sounds	favorable
Indie Launchpad	favorable

Pursuit of Happiness is the thirteenth album from Arthur Loves Plastic and was released in 2006.

== Awards ==
Pursuit of Happiness won the 2006 Wammie for Best Recording in the Electronica Category.

== Release notes ==
"Pursuit of Happiness is more thrills than dual piano with Condoleezza..."

== Album cover ==
Amazon.com initially refused to stock the album because the "cover art goes beyond what (they are) willing to accept". The album was subsequently made available from Amazon.com with a blank album cover.

== Reissue ==
Following a request by Laura Burhenn to remove the ALP remixes of her tracks on the album; Pursuit of Happiness was reissued on 22 March 2010 without the tracks "Meltdown (Freedom Mix)" and "Just for the Night (Can't Hide My Love Mix)", but with the addition of the new track "Alone Till the Day I Die (Snow Mix)" and "family-friendly" cover art.

== Track listing ==
All songs written and composed by Bev Stanton, except where noted.

=== Original release ===
No.	Title	Length
1.	"Alone Till the Day I Die"	3:12
2.	"Hypnotizin'"	3:28
3.	"The Path"	2:59
4.	"Touch"	3:48
5.	"You May Think This is Love"	2:40
6.	"Meltdown (Freedom Mix)" (Laura Burhenn remixed by ALP)	3:03
7.	"That's How They Get Ya"	3:18
8.	"Bright Side" (Linda Smith remixed by ALP)	4:51
9.	"Pursuit of Happiness"	4:00
10.	"Just for the Night (Can't Hide My Love Mix)" (Laura Burhenn remixed by ALP)	4:00
11.	"The Future"	3:25
12.	""Play Misty" (Union Carbide Remix)" (Mystified remixed by ALP)	3:27
Total length:		42:10

=== 2010 reissue ===
No.	Title	Length
1.	"Alone Till the Day I Die"	3:12
2.	"Hypnotizin'"	3:28
3.	"The Path"	2:59
4.	"Touch"	3:48
5.	"You May Think This is Love"	2:40
6.	"That's How They Get Ya"	3:18
7.	"Bright Side" (Linda Smith remixed by ALP)	4:51
8.	"Pursuit of Happiness"	4:00
9.	"The Future"	3:25
10.	""Play Misty" (Union Carbide Remix)" (Mystified remixed by ALP)	3:27
11.	"Alone Till the Day I Die (Snow Mix)"	3:52

== Original release personnel ==
- Produced by Bev Stanton in the Flamingo Room, Silver Spring, MD.
- Mastered by Bill Wolf, Wolf Productions, Arlington VA.

=== Additional musicians ===
- Heather Heimbuch - Vocals (1)
- Mental Anguish - Loops (2, 5) ^{*}
- Virus Factory - Loops (3, 11) ^{*}
- Omnitechnomatrix - Loops (7) ^{*}
- The Magical Cigarette - Loops (9) ^{*}
- Heuristics Inc. - Loops (9) ^{*}
- Robbie Magruder - Drums (9)
- Lisa Moscatiello - Vocals (9)
- Buzzsaw & The Shavings - Loops (11) ^{*}

^{*} Remixed for The Tapegerm Collective
