= Savage Bliss =

Studio album by Arthur Loves Plastic
- Released: 2004
- Genre: Electronica
- Length: 39:25
- Label: Machine Heart Music
- Producer: Bev Stanton

Arthur Loves Plastic album chronology
Higher Fruit (2003)	Savage Bliss (2004)	Love or Perish (2005)

Professional ratings
Review scores
Source	Rating
Aural Innovations	favorable
Church of Girl	favorable
Collected Sounds	favorable
Music Monthly	favorable
Smother Magazine	favorable
Washington Blade	favorable

Savage Bliss is the eleventh album from Arthur Loves Plastic and was released in 2004.

== Awards ==
Savage Bliss won the 2004 Wammie for Best Recording in the Electronica Category.

== Release notes ==
"Hell hath no fury!!! Ms. Arthur indulges her cock rock tendencies in throbbing tracks that soothe the burn of traumatic social encounters and occupational ennui. Features remixes of the 2 Skinnee J's, Stave, and Bicycle Thieves."

== Track listing ==
All tracks are written by Bev Stanton, except where noted.

No.	Title	Length
1.	"World Control"	3:12
2.	"Ecstasy"	3:34
3.	"You're a Champion" (2 Skinnee J's remixed by ALP)	4:16
4.	"Motor City (Full Martyr Fashion Remix)" (Mystified remixed by ALP)	3:22
5.	"Monument" (Bicycle Thieves remixed by ALP)	4:23
6.	"Queen of the World"	3:11
7.	"Don't Push" (Stave remixed by ALP)	3:53
8.	"Freedom"	2:53
9.	"Persona Non Grata"	2:50
10.	"Illusion"	2:44
11.	"Savage Bliss"	2:18
12.	"Worst Place in the World"	2:49
Total length:		39:25

== Personnel ==
- Produced by Bev Stanton in the Flamingo Room, Silver Spring, MD.

=== Additional musicians ===
- Toda V - Loops (1) ^{*}
- Omnitechnomatrix - Loops (2) ^{*}
- Heather Heimbuch - Vocals (6)
- Lisa Moscatiello - Guitar (6)
- Ryan Fitzgerald - Loops (8) ^{*}
- Lisa Moscatiello - Vocals (9)
- Bev Stanton - Guitar (9)
- Electroearwig - Loops (10) ^{*}
- Heuristics Inc. - Loops (10) ^{*}
- Chaos Is Your Destiny - Loops (12) ^{*}

^{*} Remixed for The Tapegerm Collective

=== Samples ===
- Dialogue from the film Colossus: The Forbin Project (1)
- Dialogue from an interview with film director John Waters (2)

== Credits ==
- Album cover designed by Scot Howard, The Digital Butterfly Project
