= Arthur Loves Plastic =

Musical artist (born 1966)

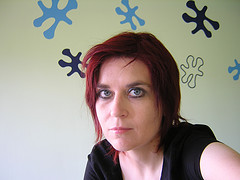

Background information
- Born: Beverly Joy Stanton; 19 October 1966 (age 59); Commonwealth of the Bahamas
- Origin: Washington, D.C., United States
- Genres: Ambient; Downtempo; Electronic; Electronica; Trance
- Years active: 1994–present
- Labels: Machine Heart Music; T.E.Q. Music? Hexagon Records
- Website: arthurlov.es

Arthur Loves Plastic or ALP is the performing name of Washington, D.C.–based electronic music recording artist Beverley Joy "Bev" Stanton.

== Biography ==
Stanton was born in the Bahamas in 1966 and raised near Walt Disney World. She recorded ALP's first project, Sperm Warfare, in her basement, and it was released in Europe by Britain's T.E.Q. Music?. After T.E.Q. folded, Stanton has independently released most of her twenty one studio albums. Her early efforts at internet promotion prompted Keyboard Magazine to feature her in a cover story on indie-music promotion.

Stanton also plays bass in the Baltimore band The Window Shoppers and is an honorary Space Dot. ALP's part-time vocalist, Lisa Moscatiello, featured three ALP tracks on her latest solo CD Trouble from the Start.

== Machine Heart Records ==
Stanton is in charge Machine Heart Records, which is an independent record label run out Washington D.C.

== Band name ==
Stanton's performing name is taken from her cat Arthur's fondness for plastic grocery bags. Arthur Loves Plastic is regularly included in internet lists of weird/funny/worst band names.

== Remixer ==
The Washington Post has referred to Stanton as a "remix master" for her work with artists such as Basehead, Emmet Swimming, Lisa Moscatiello, Nebulae, Sounds of Mass Production, Techno Squirrels and Trisomie 21.

== DJ ==
Since 2002, Stanton has performed as a Beltway club DJ – initially as a member of the First Ladies DJ Collective. She describes her style as "downtempo, progressive house, trance with original ALP tracks thrown in".

== Awards ==
Stanton and ALP have won over twenty Wammies (Washington Area Music Awards) in the Electronica category, including the 2008 Electronica Recording Wammie for the album Brief Episodes of Joy. In addition, ALP has been awarded the Electronica Emeritus Award (2008 Wammies) and Emeritus Standing in the Electronica Performing Artist (live) category (2006 Wammies), while Stanton has been awarded Emeritus Standing in the Electronica DJ category (2006 Wammies) – an honour handed out to a select few artists which acknowledges their continuing success in these fields.

== Music in other media ==
=== Advertising ===
"Feel the Love", "Boogie Bonnie Bell", "Ravish" and a brief biography for ALP feature in the GEICO Cavemen campaign's virtual website Caveman's Crib. The track "I Can Dream" was featured on Pumawomen.com.

=== Dance ===
Stanton produced the avant-garde piece "Fragile" for use in performances at The Kirov Academy of Ballet in Washington D.C.

=== Film ===
"Ooh Baby" and "If I Fell Off This Earth Tonight" feature on the soundtrack of the Canadian TV movie Apartment Story, while "Revolution (Reprise)" appears on the soundtrack of film short Paradise Attempted. The track "Afterglow" is featured in its entirety in the film-poem To Suffer Is to Slip Unnoticed, while "Klondyke 5" appears in the film-poem To Mock the Purists in Their Rabidity and "Falling" appears in the film-poem Purple Ganymede.

=== Television ===
ALP tracks have appeared on Access Hollywood, American Idol, America's Most Wanted, Anthony Bourdain: No Reservations, Extra, Lesbian Sex & Sexuality, Mind of Mencia, MTV Cribs, Sexy Girls Next Door, The Oprah Winfrey Show and Undressed.

=== Theatre ===
Eleven ALP tracks feature in the Solocat Productions Los Angeles premiere of David Hare's play The Blue Room, and are included on The Blue Room soundtrack album. In the Rogue Machine production of Diana Son's play Stop Kiss, the track "Yeah Baby" is featured in a scene at a lesbian club.

== Personal life ==
Openly gay, Stanton is a regular performer at Queering Sound, an annual festival staged in Washington, D.C. which focuses on alternative artists from the LGBT community.

== Discography ==
=== Studio albums ===
- The Zero State (1995)
- Professor Fate (1996)
- Teflon Diva! (1997)
- Slice (1998)
- Klondyke 5 (1999)
- Second Avenue Detour (2000)
- Fixed Star (2001)
- No Nations, No Peoples (2002)
- Nadir (2003)
- Higher Fruit (2003)
- Savage Bliss (2004)
- Love or Perish (2005)
- Pursuit of Happiness (2006)
- Troubled (2006)
- Beneath the Watchful Eyes (2007)
- Brief Episodes of Joy (2008)
- King Shag (2008)
- Give It (2009)
- Deeper (2010)
- Special When Lit (2012)
- Strings (2013)
