= Aleksey Granovsky =

Russian theatre and film director (1890–1937)

- Алексей Грановский
- Born: Abram Mikhaylovich Azarkh; 23 September 1890; Moscow, Russian Empire
- Died: 11 March 1937 (aged 46); Paris, France
- Occupations: Theatre director, film director
- Years active: 1914–1936

Aleksey Mikhaylovich Granovsky (Russian: Алексей Михайлович Грановский, romanized: Aleksey Mikhaylovich Granovsky; born Abram Mikhaylovich Azarkh [Абрам Михайлович Азарх]; 23 September [O.S. 11 September] 1890 – 11 March 1937) was a Russian theatre and film director.

== Life and career ==
Granovsky was born Abraham Azarkh into a Jewish family in Moscow. After studying in St. Petersburg, he went to Munich where he gained valuable theatre experience working under Max Reinhardt. He served in the Russian army during the First World War before in 1919 he set up his own Jewish-orientated theatre in St. Petersburg, which under a new director became GOSET. Granovsky's reputation rose quickly over the following years, as he became one of the most celebrated theatre directors in Europe. In 1925 Granovsky directed his first film, a silent, but concentrated his efforts on his stage work.

After the Russian Revolution, and the Communist victory in the Russian Civil War, Granovsky continued to live in the country even though he felt himself culturally Western European. Granovsky was initially feted by the Soviet authorities and was awarded a number of honours but he began to find their cultural policies increasingly restrictive, and emigrated to the Weimar Republic in the late 1920s.

In Germany, Granovsky worked on some theatre productions, but increasingly moved into film. He collaborated with a number of other Russian exiles such as Léo Lania who shared his left-wing political views. He directed two German films, before emigrating to Paris where he lived for the rest of his life. He produced and directed expensive prestige films The Adventures of King Pausole (1933) and Taras Bulba (1936).

== Personal life and death ==
Granovsky had married a wealthy German woman, but they separated before his death. Despite his lavish lifestyle, Granovsky died comparatively poor in Paris in 1937, aged 46.

== Selected filmography ==
=== Director ===
- Jewish Luck (Еврейское счастье; 1925)
- The Song of Life (1931)
- The Trunks of Mr. O.F. (1931)
- The Adventures of King Pausole (1933)
- Moscow Nights (1934)
- Taras Bulba (1936)

== Bibliography ==
- Barton, Ruth. Hedy Lamarr: The Most Beautiful Woman in Film. University Press of Kentucky, 2010.
