= Give It =

Studio album by Arthur Loves Plastic
- Released: 8 September 2009
- Genre: Electronica
- Length: 43:23
- Label: Machine Heart Music
- Producer: Bev Stanton

Arthur Loves Plastic album chronology
King Shag (2008)	Give It (2009)	Deeper (2010)

Professional ratings
Review scores
Source	Rating
Collected Sounds	favorable
Dead Earnest	favorable

Give It is the eighteenth album from Arthur Loves Plastic and was released in 2009.

== Release notes ==
"Another mischievous instalment from Arthur Loves Plastic, with electro and contemporized disco flourishes. From the demanding groove of "Give It" to the house-engorged throb of "Searching for Love" this is an artist coming of age yet not getting old."

== Track listing ==
All tracks are written by Bev Stanton, except where noted.

No.	Title	Length
1.	"Give It"	5:09
2.	"Love This Feeling"	4:00
3.	"Do You Feel?"	3:43
4.	"I Ain't Happy"	2:41
5.	"The Right Way"	3:35
6.	"Here I Come!"	3:25
7.	"Intoxicated"	2:59
8.	"Searching for Love"	3:46
9.	"Fever"	3:42
10.	"Hurting Divinely"	3:22
11.	"Give Me Love"	3:49
12.	"Forbidden" (Paula Knight remixed by ALP)	3:12
Total length:		43:23

The track "Hurting Divinely" is also known as "Hurt Me So Badly" and "Sad".

== Personnel ==
- Produced by Bev Stanton at Sligo House, Silver Spring, MD.

=== Additional musicians ===
- Harry Applebaum - Organ (1)
- Phil Mathieu - Guitar (2, 9)
- Chris Phinney - Loops (2)
- Anti Gravity Workshop - Loops (3, 11) ^{*}
- Buzzsaw & The Shavings - Loops (3) ^{*}
- John Nazdin - Bass (4, 5)
- Robbie Magruder - Drum Loops (4, 5)
- Cystem - Guitar (7, 8, 11) ^{*}
- Phil Mathieu - Guitar (Excerpt from "Chamber Music with Guitar") (9)
- Carolyn Hyun Ha Oh - Flute (Excerpt from "Chamber Music with Guitar") (9)
- Dan Henderson - Cello (Excerpt from "Chamber Music with Guitar") (9)

^{*} Remixed for The Tapegerm Collective

== Credits ==
- Gabriella Fabbri (duchessa/stock.xchng) - Cover image
