= The Pursuit of Happiness (1971 film) =

1971 film by Robert Mulligan

- VHS cover
- Directed by: Robert Mulligan
- Written by: Jon Boothe; George L. Sherman; Novel: Thomas Rogers
- Produced by: David Susskind
- Starring: Michael Sarrazin; Barbara Hershey
- Cinematography: Dick Kratina
- Edited by: Folmar Blangsted
- Music by: Dave Grusin
- Distributed by: Columbia Pictures
- Release date: February 23, 1971
- Running time: 93 minutes
- Country: United States
- Language: English

The Pursuit of Happiness is a 1971 American drama film about a student who goes on the run to avoid serving his full prison sentence for vehicular manslaughter. The film was directed by Robert Mulligan. The producer was David Susskind and the associate producer Alan Shayne. The movie was based on the novel by Thomas Rogers, with a screenplay written by Jon Boothe and George L. Sherman.

== Plot ==
College student William Popper (Michael Sarrazin) is visited by his aunt Ruth who persuades him to drive to see his father, which he opts to do rather than attend a talk with his girlfriend Jane (Barbara Hershey), later that evening, much to her annoyance.

He sets off to see his father in Connecticut in heavy rain after sunset, in a small sports car. With limited visibility he accidentally strikes a woman who is crossing between parked cars still in the city centre. Although no-one has witnessed the accident he hands himself in to the police. He is interviewed by detective Cromie who establishes he has no licence and no insurance. He obtains a lawyer, Daniel Lawrence, who arrives with his father John Popper. After speaking with the lawyer he takes his father to his rooms, inviting him to meet Jane. His friend Melvin arrives and instantly asks the father for money, knowing he is a millionaire. Jane arrives and William leaves her with his father while he has a private chat with Melvin. He gets rid of Melvin and returns to the room. Only when his father leaves does he confess to Jane that he killed someone that evening.

Against the advice of the lawyer he goes to the home of the dead woman to apologise to the family, who are less than pleased by his presence. William then goes to the family home, which is under the thumb of William's grandmother. The grandmother belittles her servants and suggests that the dead woman was probably drunk, because she was Irish. The grandmother insists that William gets a character analysis on the dead woman, Mrs Conroy.

Back with his girlfriend, they debate the value of wearing a suit. He wears it, but the judge sees him as a negligent and disobedient individual.

He is convicted of criminal negligence for the killing of Mrs Conroy. He is sentenced to one year in prison. He is given the weekend to spend with Jane before he begins the sentence. He shares a cell with James J. Moran. Moran is a former senator who is in prison for embezzlement of state funds. A new friend, George Wilson gets stabbed and killed in the showers by fellow inmate McArdle. William has to appear at the murder trial, and explain that he was helping him write a homosexual love letter. The trial twists things to look as if he is homosexual. The line of questioning seems irrelevant to the killing. During a court recess he escapes though an open window while being allowed a toilet break. He heads straight to the university to see Jane. The police have got there first and are warning Jane that she will be in trouble if she helps him, but they do not spot William.

He sits with Jane and Melvin on a rooftop and discuss handing himself in, as he only has a week left on his sentence. He makes his way to the family home at night. His grandmother takes him for an intruder and sets the dogs on him. He tells his grandmother that he needs money as he has decided to leave the country. She gives him $3000 from the safe. He gets Melvin to buy a car for $600, and starts the drive to Canada with Jane. He goes to say goodbye to his father, who tells him not to go. He sets off but the car breaks down before he leaves the city. He tracks down Melvin, who puts them in a taxi to a small private airport. A "Mr Smith" meets them there and agrees to fly them to Canada for $1000. But he will not take them until Wednesday. However, he can take them to Mexico in a couple of hours for $500 extra. They fly off, passing the Statue of Liberty as they go.

== Cast ==
- Michael Sarrazin as William Popper
- Barbara Hershey as Jane Kauffman
- Robert Klein as Melvin Lasher
- Sada Thompson as Ruth Lawrence (Aunt Ruth)
- Ralph Waite as Detective Cromie
- Arthur Hill as John Popper
- E. G. Marshall as Daniel Lawrence
- Maya Kenin as Mrs. Conroy
- Rue McClanahan as Mrs. O'Mara
- Peter White as Terence Lawrence
- Joseph Attles as Holmes
- Beulah Garrick as Josephine, the Popper family servant
- Ruth White as Mrs. Popper, William's grandmother
- Charles Durning as Guard #2
- Barnard Hughes as Judge Vogel
- David Doyle as Senator James J. Moran
- Gilbert Lewis as George Wilson
- Albert Henderson as McArdle
- William Devane as Pilot (Mr. Smith)

== See also ==
- List of American films of 1971
- Life, Liberty and the pursuit of Happiness, quote from the United States Declaration of Independence
