= The Songs of Bilitis =

1894 erotic poetry collection by Pierre Louÿs

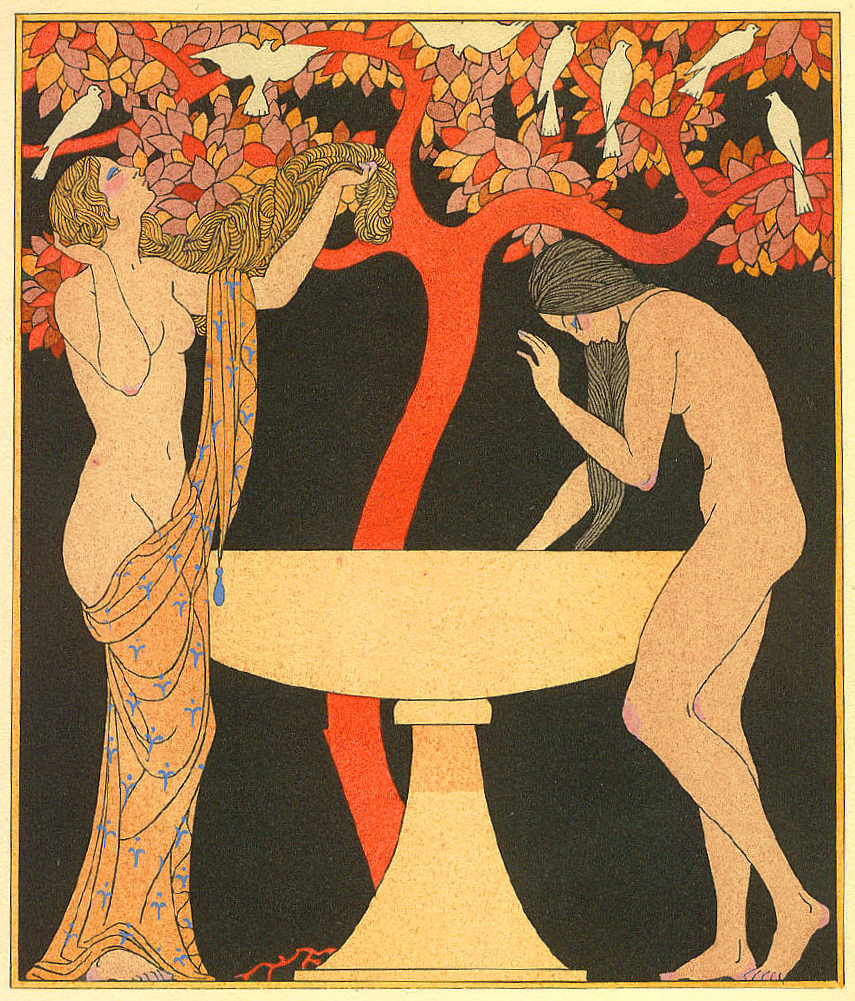
- Illustration by Georges Barbier for The Songs of Bilitis
- Author: Pierre Louÿs
- Original title: Les Chansons de Bilitis
- Language: French
- Genre: Poetry, erotica
- Publication date: 1894
- Publication place: France
- Media type: Print

The Songs of Bilitis (/bɪˈliːtɪs/; French: Les Chansons de Bilitis) is a collection of erotic, essentially lesbian, poetry by Pierre Louÿs published in Paris in 1894. Since Louÿs claimed that he had translated the original poetry from Ancient Greek, this work is considered a pseudotranslation. The poems were fabulations, authored by Louÿs himself, and are still considered important literature.

The poems are in the manner of Sappho; the collection's introduction claims they were found on the walls of a tomb in Cyprus, written by a woman of Ancient Greece called Bilitis (Greek: Βιλιτις), a courtesan and contemporary of Sappho's to whose life Louÿs dedicated a small section of the book. On publication, the volume deceived even expert scholars.

Louÿs claimed the 143 prose poems, excluding 3 epitaphs, were entirely the work of this ancient poet—a place where she poured both her most intimate thoughts and most public actions, from childhood innocence in Pamphylia to the loneliness and chagrin of her later years.

Although for the most part The Songs of Bilitis is original work, many of the poems were reworked epigrams from the Palatine Anthology, and Louÿs even borrowed some verses from Sappho herself. The poems are a blend of mellow sensuality and polished style in the manner of Parnassianism, but underneath run subtle Gallic undertones that Louÿs could never escape.

To lend authenticity to the forgery, Louÿs in the index listed some poems as "untranslated"; he even craftily fabricated an entire section of his book called "The Life of Bilitis", crediting a certain fictional archaeologist Herr G. Heim ("Mr. C. Cret" in German) as the discoverer of Bilitis's tomb. And though Louÿs displayed great knowledge of Ancient Greek culture, ranging from children's games in "Tortie Tortue" to application of scents in "Perfumes", the literary fraud was eventually exposed. This did little, however, to taint their literary value in readers' eyes, and Louÿs's open and sympathetic celebration of lesbian sexuality earned him sensation and historic significance.

== Background ==
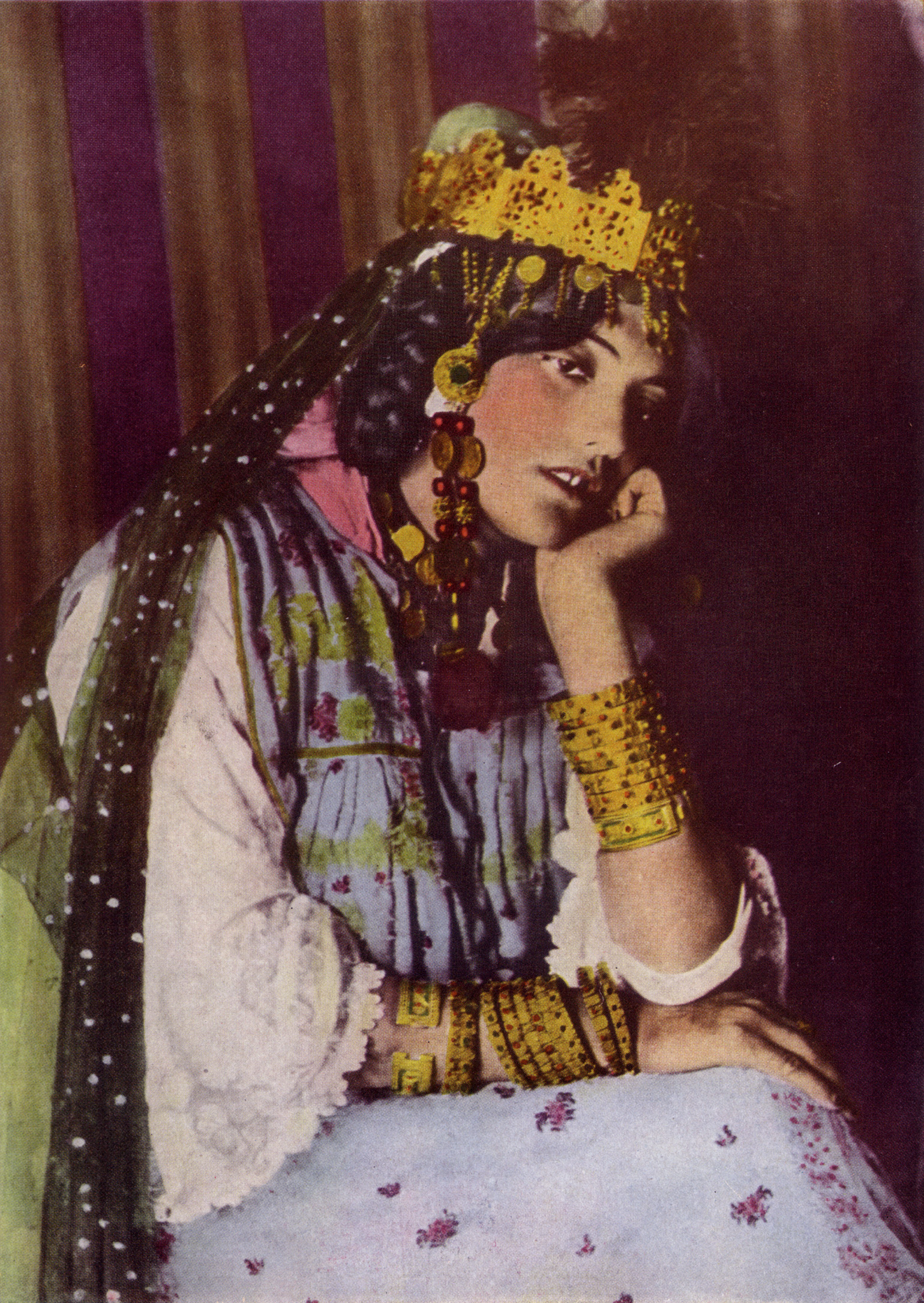
A dancer in Biskra

In 1894 Louÿs, travelling in Italy with his friend Ferdinand Hérold, grandson of the composer of the same name (1791–1831), met André Gide, who described how he had just lost his virginity to a Berber girl named Meriem in the oasis resort-town of Biskra in Algeria; Gide urged his friends to go to Biskra and follow his example. The Songs of Bilitis are the result of Louÿs and Hérold's shared encounter with Meriem the dancing-girl, and the poems are dedicated to Gide with a special mention to "M.b.A", Meriem ben Atala.

== Basic structure ==
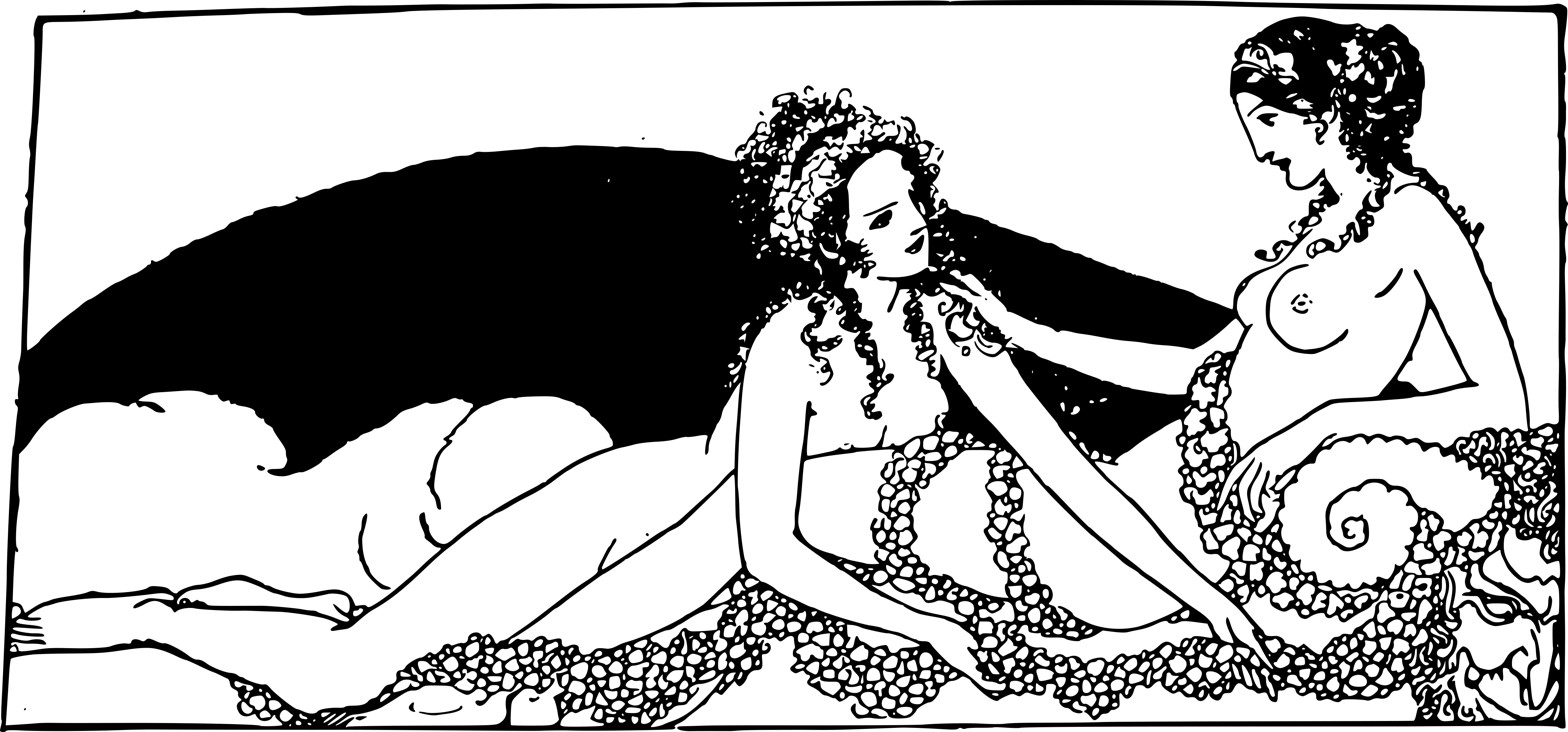
Bilitis and Mnasidika as illustrated by Willy Pogány (1926).

The Songs of Bilitis are separated into three cycles, each representative of a phase of Bilitis's life: Bucolics in Pamphylia—childhood and first sexual encounters, Elegies at Mytilene—indulgence in homosexual sensuality, and Epigrams in the Isle of Cyprus—life as a courtesan. Each cycle progresses toward a melancholy conclusion, each conclusion signalling a new, more complex chapter of experience, emotion, and sexual exploration. Each of these melancholy conclusions is demarcated by a tragic turn in Bilitis's relationships with others. In the first stage of her life, Bucolics, she falls in love with a young man but is then raped by him after he comes upon her napping in the woods; she marries him and has a child by him, but his abusive behavior compels her to abandon the relationship. In the second stage (Elegies), her relationship with her beloved Mnasidika turns cold and ends in estrangement, prompting her to relocate once again. Finally, in the Epigrams, in the Isle of Cyprus, despite her fame, she finds herself longing for Mnasidika. Ultimately, she and her beauty are largely forgotten; she pens her poems in silent obscurity, resolute in her knowledge that "those who will love when [she is] gone will sing [her] songs together, in the dark."

One of Louÿs's technical accomplishments was to coincide Bilitis's growing maturity and emotional complexity with her changing views of divinity and the world around her—after leaving Pamphylia and Mytilene, she becomes involved in intricate mysteries, moving away from a mythical world inhabited by satyrs and Naiads. This change is perhaps best reflected by the symbolic death of the satyrs and Naiads in "The Tomb of the Naiads".

== Bilitis ==
Louÿs dedicated a small section of the book to the fictional character of Bilitis (Greek: Βιλιτις), whom he invented for the book's purpose. He claimed she was a courtesan and contemporary of Sappho's, and the author of the poems that he had translated. He went so far as not only to outline her life in a biographical sketch, but also to describe how her fictional tomb was discovered by a fictional archeological expedition, and include a list of additional, "untranslated", works by her.

== Influence ==
While the work was eventually shown to be a pseudotranslation by Louÿs, initially it misled a number of scholars, such as Jean Bertheroy, who retranslated several poems without realizing they were fakes.

Like the poems of Sappho, those of The Songs of Bilitis address themselves to Sapphic love. The book became a sought-after cult item among the 20th-century lesbian underground and was only reprinted officially in the 1970s. The expanded French second edition is reprinted in facsimile by Dover Books in America. This second edition had a title page that read: "This little book of antique love is respectfully dedicated to the young women of a future society."

In 1955, the Daughters of Bilitis was founded in San Francisco as the first lesbian civil and political rights organization in the United States. In regard to its name, Del Martin and Phyllis Lyon, two of the group's founders, said "If anyone asked us, we could always say we belong to a poetry club."

In 1965, Peggy Caserta named her clothing store in Haight-Ashbury Mnasidika after a character in The Songs of Bilitis.

== Adaptations ==
- In 1897, Louÿs's close friend Claude Debussy set three of the poems—La flûte de Pan, La chevelure and Le tombeau des Naïades—as songs for female voice and piano. The composer returned to the collection in a more elaborate fashion in 1900, creating Musique de scène pour les chansons de Bilitis (also known as Chansons de Bilitis) for recitation of twelve of Louÿs's poems. These pieces were scored for two flutes, two harps and celesta. According to contemporary sources, the recitation and music were accompanied by tableaux vivants as well. Apparently, only one private performance of the entire creation took place, in Venice. Debussy did not publish the score in his lifetime, but he later adapted six of the twelve for piano as Six Epigraphes Antiques in 1914.
- French composer and pianist Rita Strohl composed her settings of 12 Chansons de Bilitis in 1898. They were performed by Jane Bathori. There is a modern recording by Marianne Croux and Anne Bertin-Hugault.
- French composer Charles Koechlin completed his five Chansons de Bilitis, Op.39 between 1898 and 1908. The first complete performance was on 29 January 1918 by Jane Bathori and Andrée Vaurabourg. They were published in 1923.
- Brazilian composer Luciano Gallet set his Deux chansons de Bilitis for three voices and piano in 1920.
- Polish composer Roman Maciejewski published The Songs of Bilitis (translated into Polish by Leopold Staff) for soprano & orchestra in 1935.
- Joseph Kosma's comédie musicale (or operetta) Les chansons de Bilitis was produced in Paris in 1954 at the Théâtre des Capucines.
- Michael Findlay and Roberta Findlay made a 1966 sexploitation film titled Take Me Naked which features narrated passages from The Songs of Bilitis. In the film, the main character is shown in bed reading the collected works of Pierre Louÿs. He then has a series of erotic dreams depicting nude or scantily dressed women while a female voice narrates passages of the Bilitis poetry.
- The 1977 French film Bilitis, directed by David Hamilton and starring Patti D'Arbanville and Mona Kristensen, was based on Louÿs's book, as stated in the opening credits. It concerns a twentieth-century girl and her sexual awakening, but the British magazine Time Out said that, "surprisingly, a strong hint of Louys' erotic spirit survives, transmitted mainly through the effective playing and poise of the two leading characters."
- More recently Songs of Bilitis, a play adapted from the poems by Katie Polebaum with music by Ego Plum, was performed by Rogue Artists Ensemble under a commission from the Getty Villa in Los Angeles.

== Translations ==
The book was translated into Polish twice, in 1920 by Leopold Staff and in 2010 by Robert Stiller.

English translations:

- Horace Manchester Brown in 1904. "Privately printed for members of The Aldus Society" (https://openlibrary.org/books/OL24152668M/The_songs_of_Bilitis)
- Parnassian Society in 1920. "Done into English and Privately Printed for the Parnassian Society." Limited to 300 copies.
- Alvah C. Bessie in 1926. "Privately printed for subscribers" (https://www.sacred-texts.com/cla/sob/sob000.htm)
- H.M. Bird in 1931. Argus Books.
- J. Rolf in 2013.

== Illustrations ==
The Songs of Bilitis has been illustrated extensively by numerous artists.

The most famous artist to illustrate the book was the French painter Louis Icart, while the most famous illustrations were done by the Hungarian artist Willy Pogany for a 1926 privately circulated English language translation: they were drawn in an art-deco style, with numerous visual puns on sexual objects, such as the couch in The Living Past which has an undeniable phallic shape.

Other artists have been Georges Barbier, Edouard Chimot, Jeanne Mammen, Pascal Pia, Joseph Kuhn-Régnier, Sigismunds Vidbergs, Pierre Leroy, Alméry Lobel Riche, Suzanne Ballivet, Pierre Lissac, Paul-Emile Bécat, Monique Rouver, Génia Minache, Lucio Milandre, A-E Marty, J.A. Bresval, James Fagan and Albert Gaeng from Geneva.

== See also ==
- 1894 in poetry
- Lyric poetry
- Prose poetry
