= Fixed Star =

Studio album by Arthur Loves Plastic
- Released: 2001
- Genre: Electronica
- Length: 46:01
- Label: Machine Heart Music
- Producer: Bev Stanton

Arthur Loves Plastic album chronology
Second Avenue Detour (2000)	Fixed Star (2001)	No Nations, No Peoples (2002)

Professional ratings
Review scores
Source	Rating
Electrogarden	favorable

Fixed Star is the seventh album from Arthur Loves Plastic and was released in 2001.

== Release notes ==
"Ms. Arthur embraces the thrill of the dancefloor in these remixed tracks from Teflon Diva, Slice, and Klondyke 5."

== Track listing ==
All tracks are written by Bev Stanton.

No.	Title	Length
1.	"Cum2Nite"	4:06
2.	"Bright Lights, Big City"	4:06
3.	"You Won't"	4:04
4.	"No Love"	4:36
5.	"Betrayed"	3:59
6.	"GIAWO"	3:23
7.	"Give Me Hope"	4:06
8.	"Alone"	3:50
9.	"Fixed Star"	4:11
10.	"Ashtray"	3:56
11.	"Hold Me"	3:15
12.	"My Love"	2:29
Total length:		46:01

The Internet Archive version of Fixed Star includes full length versions of all the tracks, rather than the segued versions that appeared on the original release.
