= The Adventures of King Pausole =

1900 novel by Pierre Louÿs

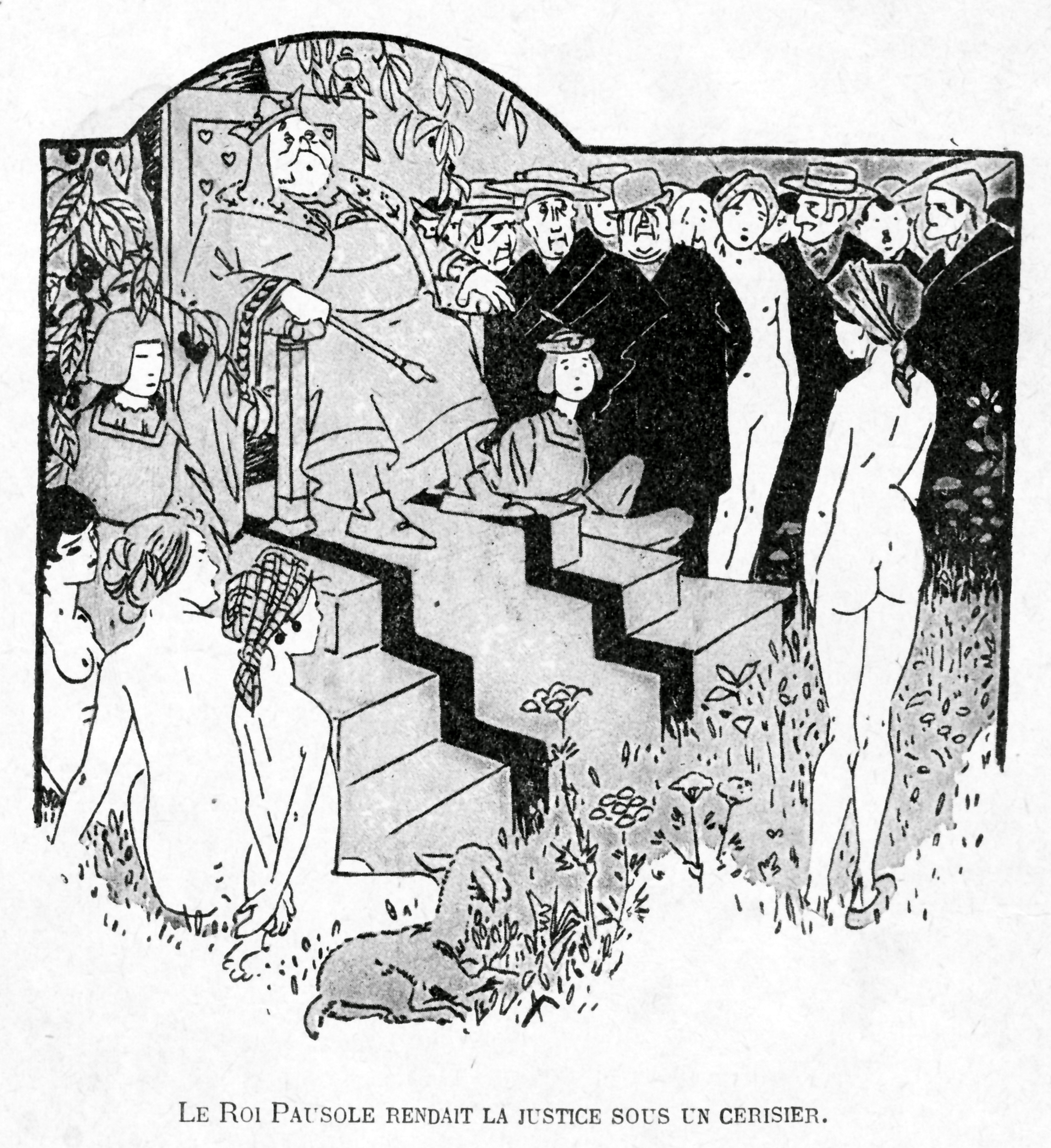
'King Pausole dispensed justice under a cherry tree'. Illustration after Carlègle, 1907

The Adventures of King Pausole (French: Les Aventures du roi Pausole) is a French novel with erotic themes by Pierre Louÿs, first published in serial form in 1900. The work has been called "a graceful and spicy bit of drollery".

It was the basis for the 1930 operetta Les aventures du roi Pausole with music by Arthur Honegger.

== Sources ==
- Lang, Bluma Renée (1947). "Louÿs, Pierre". In Smith, Horatio (ed.). Columbia Dictionary of Modern European Literature. United States of America: Columbia University Press. p. 495.
- Louÿs, Pierre (1901). Les aventures du roi Pausole. Paris: Eugène Fasquelle.
- Louÿs, Pierre (1933). The Adventures of King Pausole. Translated by Lumley, Charles Hope. New York, NY: privately printed for William Godwin, Inc.
