= Joseph Kuhn-Régnier =

French affichiste and caricaturist (1873–1940)

Joseph Kuhn-Réginier
- Born: Joseph Louis Wilfrid Kuhn-Regnier; 10 December 1873
- Died: c..1940
- Style: Erotic Art
- Movement: Greek Art, Classical art

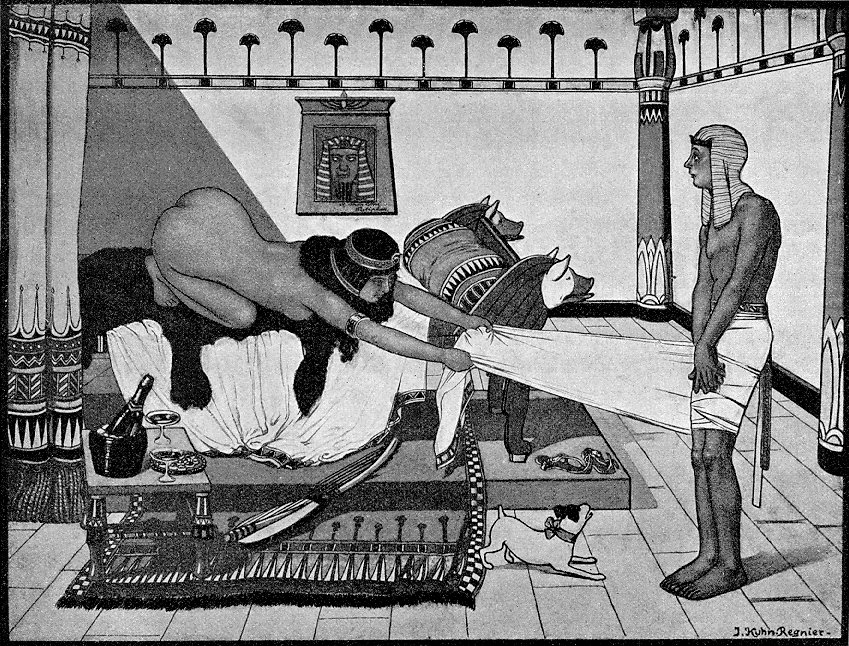
1910 comic caricature of Potiphar's wife and Joseph

Joseph Kuhn-Régnier, (born as Joseph Louis Wilfrid Kuhn-Regnier ,10 December 1873 - 1940) was a French illustrator, draughtsman, and painter who worked and exhibited in Paris at the Salon d'Automne. His work is recognizable by his characters inspired by Greek and classical art. He contributed full-page colored illustrations and advertisements to society magazines between 1911 and 1934 such as La Vie Parisienne, Fantasio, and Le Sourire. In 1932 he created colored illustrations for four volume collection The Works of Hippocrates, published by Javal & Bourdeaux in Paris. He also created illustrations for the erotic work The Songs of Bilitis in the 1930s.
