= Louis Icart =

French painter (1888–1950)

- Born: Louis Justin Laurent Icart; 9 December 1888; Toulouse, France
- Died: 20 December 1950 (aged 62); Paris, France
- Occupations: Painter; graphic artist; illustrator
- Spouse: Fanny Volmers
- Parent(s): Jean Icart; Elisabeth Icart

Louis Justin Laurent Icart (French: [lwi ʒystɛ̃ loʁɑ̃ ikaʁ]; born 9 December 1888 in Toulouse, died 20 December 1950 in Paris) was a French painter, graphic artist, and illustrator.

== Life ==
Louis Justin Laurent Icart was the first son of Jean and Elisabeth Icart. He started drawing early on. His aunt, who was impressed by his talent during a visit, brought him to Paris in 1907, where he dedicated himself to painting, drawing and the production of numerous etchings.

In the studio, where he initially produced frivolous postcards with copies of existing images, he soon designed his own works. Thereupon he received orders for the design of title pages for the magazine La Critique Théâtrale. Icart's drawings were in vogue during the Art Deco period. Fashion houses hired Icart to create fashion sketches, with which he soon became known. In 1913 he showed his pictures at the Salon des Humoristes. Icart then learned the technique of copperplate engraving and from then on worked with this process. He was now working for the large French design studios and illustrated their catalogs. In 1914 he met the eighteen-year-old "beautiful blonde" Fanny Volmers, an employee of the Paquin fashion house, whom he married later and who was the model for many of his works.

Icart participated in the First World War as a fighter pilot. During this time he made countless sketches and etchings with patriotic themes. On his return, he made prints of his work, mostly using aquatint and drypoint etching. Because of the great demand, he often published two versions, one for the European and another for the American market.

In 1920 he exhibited at the Paris Simonson Gallery, where he received mixed reviews. In 1922, Louis Icart traveled with Fanny to New York City for his first American exhibition, which was first shown in the Belmaison gallery in John Wanamaker's department store and later moved to Wanamakers in Philadelphia. For his fifty oil paintings shown, he received mixed reviews again.

In the late 1920s, Icart was very successful both artistically and financially with his publications and his work for large fashion and design studios. He began chronicling the shift from the fussy fashions of the late 19th century to the more sinuous and shapely world of early 20th century art deco. The popularity of his etchings peaked in the Art Deco era. Icart depicted life in Paris and New York in the 1920s and 1930s in his own style of painting. Success in 1930 enabled him to buy a magnificent house on the Montmartre hill in the north of Paris. In 1932 Icart showed in the New York Metropolitan Galleries a collection of paintings entitled Les Visions Blanches, which received little attention, however, because he did not personally accompany the exhibition.

After the German western campaign, Icart turned to more serious issues. With L'Exode, he created a series of works that document the horrors of the occupation of France in World War II from 1940 onwards. During this time, Icart had to flee Paris and leave behind some of these works, which were only rediscovered in the attic of a Paris art academy together with some of his earlier works in the 1970s.

Icart died in his Parisian house in 1950.

== Work ==
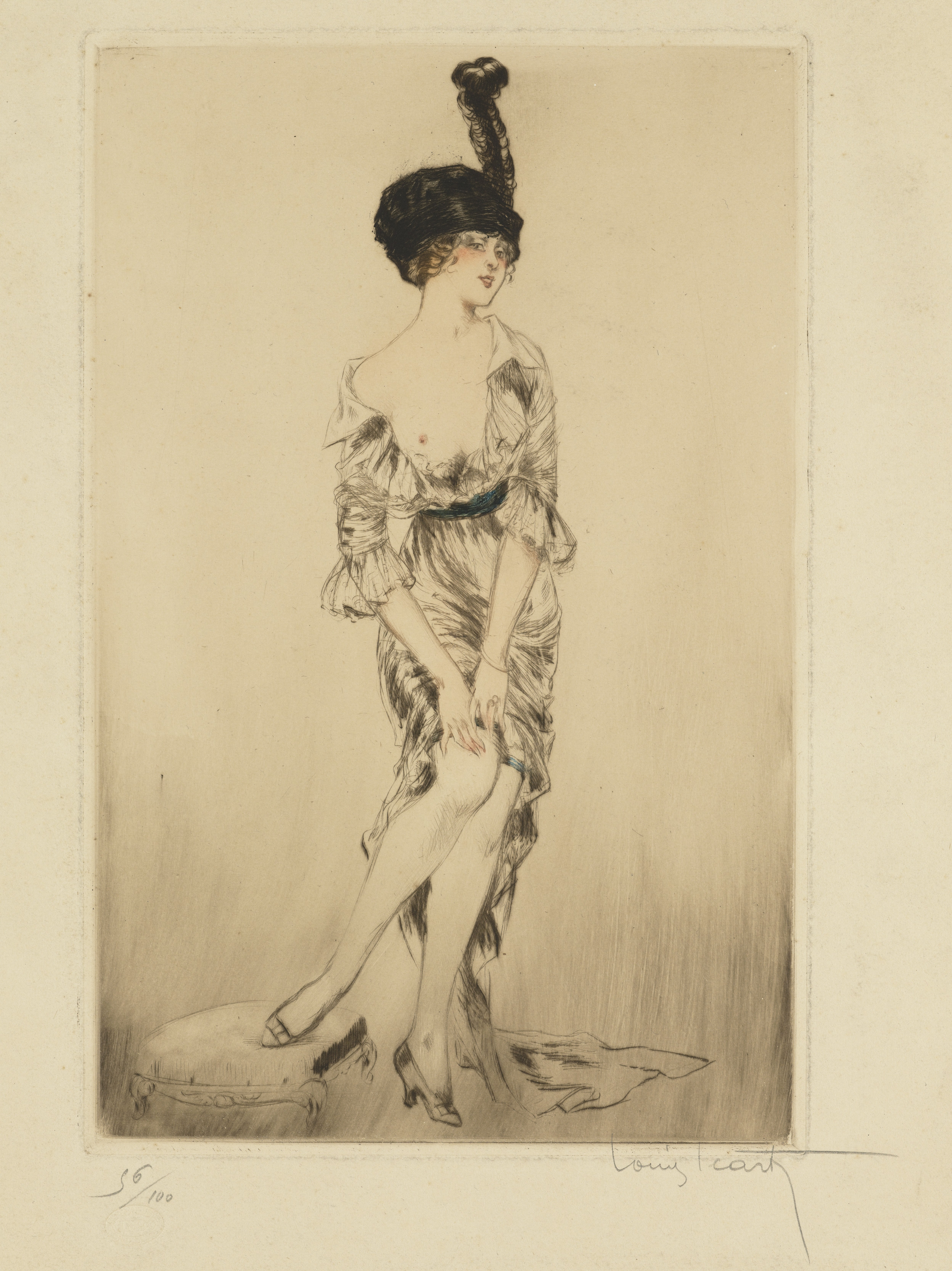
A fashionable young woman, 1920s

Icart's style of painting was based on the French masters of the 18th century, such as Jean-Antoine Watteau, François Boucher and Jean-Honoré Fragonard. His drawings were influenced by Edgar Degas and Claude Monet; his rare watercolors bore features of the symbolists Odilon Redon and Gustave Moreau. Many of his early atmospheric paintings are in shades of brown, gold, and red; however, his pictures became brighter during his career.

Icart's depictions of women were mostly sensual, often erotic, but also always humorous and full of hinted or direct sexuality. In his pictures, beautiful courtesans frolicked on thick pillows with facial expressions full of passion, dismay or surprise. Horses, dogs or cats were often part of his subjects.

Icart made over 500 engravings and illustrated more than 30 books. His works have titles like:

- Intimité, 1917
- Paresse, 1925
- Carmen, 1927
- La Dame aux Camellias, 1927
- Mimi, 1927
- Casanova, 1928
- Ecoute, 1928
- Eve, 1928
- Faust, 1928
- Le Poeme, 1928
- Tosca, 1928
- Venus, 1928
- Chien et Chat, 1929
- Hydrangeas, 1929
- Symphonie en Bleu, 1936
- Le sofa, 1937
- Les Orchidées, 1937
- Monsieur l'Amour, 1940
- Léda et le cygne, 1950

Icart is "increasingly being recognized as one of the important artists of the period”.
