= Teflon Don (disambiguation) =

"Teflon Don" was a nickname for American mobster John Gotti (1940–2002).

Teflon Don may also refer to:

== People ==
- Donald Trump (born 1946), 45th and 47th President of the United States who is sometimes referred to as "Teflon Don" by critics
- Pedro Sánchez (born 1972), Prime Minister of Spain who is sometimes referred as "Teflon Don" due to multiple corruption cases appearing around his figure
- Rick Ross (born 1976), American rap producer whose original rap name was "Teflon Da Don"
- Vito Rizzuto (1946–2013), Canadian mafia leader known as "Montreal's Teflon Don" and "Canada's Teflon Don"

== Other uses ==
- Teflon Don (album), by Rick Ross, 2010
- "Teflon Don", a song by Mike Lindup from Changes 2, 2023
- "Teflon Don", a song by Future from Mixtape Pluto, 2024

== See also ==
- Teflon John (disambiguation)
- Stefflon Don
