= Rogue Artists Ensemble =

Rogue Artists Ensemble is a theater company based in Los Angeles, California that specializes in “Hyper-theatrical” performance. According to the mission statement on the company’s official website:

Rogue Artists Ensemble is a collective of multi-disciplinary artists who create Hyper-theater, an innovative hybrid of theater traditions, puppetry, mask work, dance, music, and modern technology. Through a collaborative development process, with an emphasis on design and storytelling, the Rogues create original, thought provoking performances. We cultivate unique audience experiences that appeal to multiple generations of theatergoers in order to expand the boundaries of contemporary American theater.

Hallmarks of Rogue Artists shows include mask work, puppetry, and digital projection. Many Rogue Artists shows are adapted from existing works, but the final scripts are always written in-house via a collaborative process. Although most Rogue Artists shows tend to employ adult themes, the group also runs a children’s program with workshops and performances for those too young to attend regular Rogue performances.

== History ==
Rogue Artists Ensemble was founded in 2001 by students at the University of California, Irvine. Their first three shows, "Hyperbole", "The Poe Play" (based on the stories of Edgar Allan Poe), and "Pip" (based on the novel Great Expectations by Charles Dickens) were performed on campus.

In 2003, the group became a not-for-profit 501(c)(3) company and began performing independently of the members’ alma mater. Subsequent shows were performed in small venues around Los Angeles and Orange County, California.

In 2006, and again in 2008, the Rogues received a grant from the Jim Henson Foundation to produce an adaptation of Neil Gaiman and Dave McKean’s The Tragical Comedy or Comical Tragedy of Mr. Punch.

In 2009 the Rogues created an original adaptation of three shorts stories by Nikolai Gogol–"The Overcoat", "The Nose", and "Diary of a Madman"–entitled Gogol Project. The play was written by Kitty Felde with original music and songs by Ego Plum.

== Collaborations ==
The Rogue Artists Ensemble have collaborated with a number of other artists, including writer Neil Gaiman, illustrator Dave McKean, writer Angus Oblong, and musicians such as The Ditty Bops, Jack Irons, Two Sheds, and composer Ben Phelps.

== Reviews ==
LA Times LA Times photo spread ExperienceLA
