= Lisa Moscatiello =

American singer (born 1966)

- Born: April 4, 1966 (age 58)
- Origin: Arlington County, Virginia, United States
- Genres: Folk
- Occupation(s): Singer, songwriter
- Instrument(s): Vocals; Guitar
- Years active: 1982–present
- Labels: Happy Cactus; Machine Heart; Shipwhistle; Wind River
- Website: lisamoscatiello.com

Lisa Moscatiello is an American singer who is part of the Washington, DC–area music scene. She is listed in Music Hound's Folk: Essential Album Guide, and is most often categorized as a folk vocalist. Moscatiello is, however, known for her versatility and range, and has appeared on stage singing the music of Scottish fiddler Johnny Cunningham in a production by the avant-garde theatre group Mabou Mines, and is featured on recordings by the Washington, DC–area electronica band, Arthur Loves Plastic.

A native of Arlington, Virginia, she attended Yale University from 1984 to 1988. She was actively involved in Yale's a cappella music community as a member of the group Redhot & Blue. She was a member of the British-style folk-rock band The New St. George from 1989 to 1994. She joined the New York–based Celtic-fusion band Whirligig in 1996, and performed with them through 2002, with appearances at the Philadelphia Folk Festival, the Newport Folk Festival, and Britain's Cropredy Festival.

In 2005, she formed her own jazz-folk hybrid band called The Space Dots, and recorded an album of "acid cabaret" songs with them called Trouble from the Start. Other recent projects of note include Jennifer Cutting's Ocean (2003) album featuring Maddy Prior and Gabriel Yacoub and Well Kept Secrets (2003) with fiddler Rosie Shipley.

== Discography ==
- Innocent When You Dream (1997)
- Second Avenue (2000)
- What Happens After Love (with Fred Lieder) (2002)
- Well Kept Secrets (with Rosie Shipley) (2003)
- Trouble from the Start (2005)
