= Inland port =

Port on an inland waterway

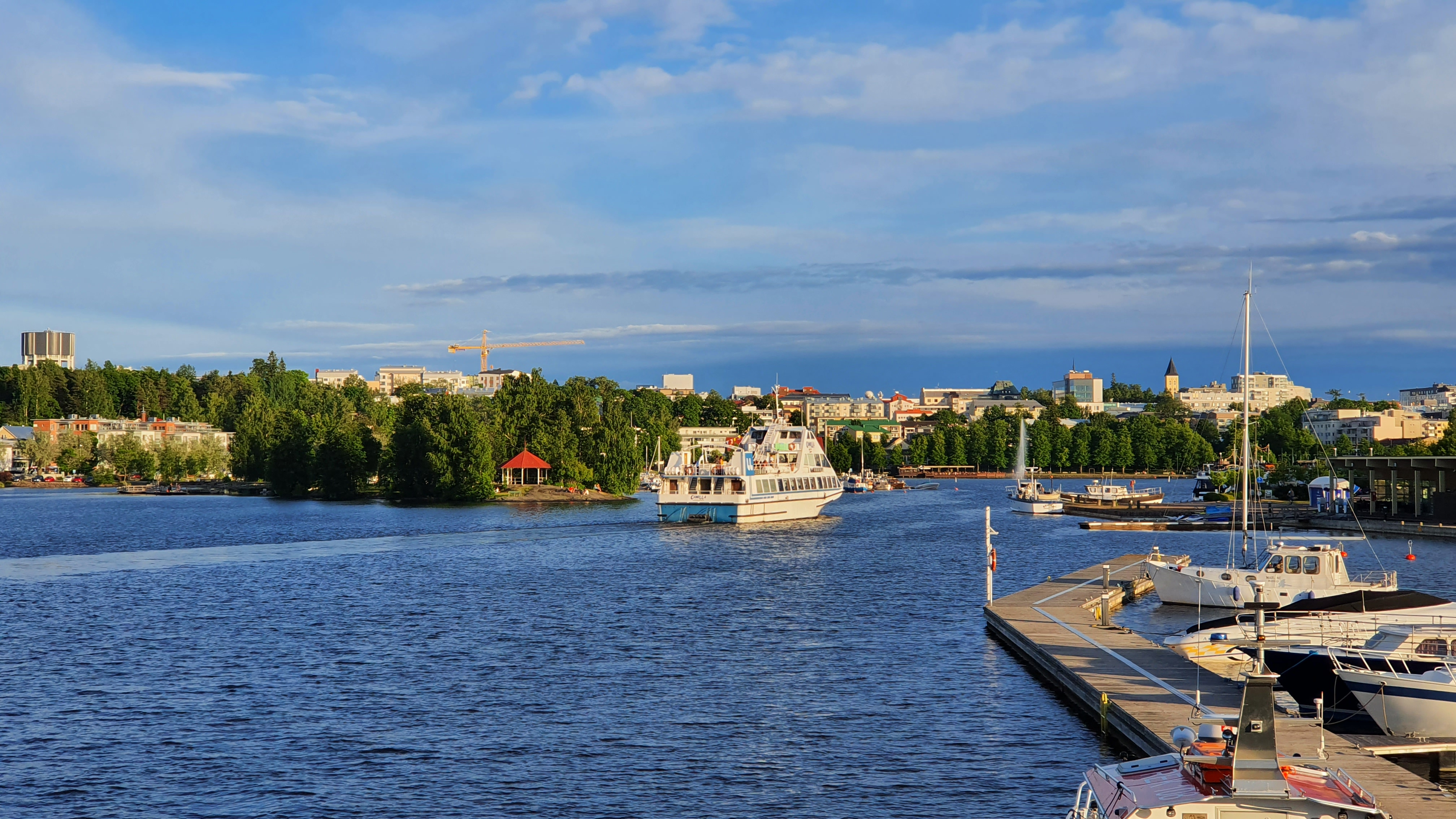
The Port of Lappeenranta on the Lake Saimaa in Lappeenranta, Finland

An inland port is a port on an inland waterway, such as a river, lake, or canal, which may or may not be connected to the sea. The term "inland port" is also used to refer to a dry port.

== Examples ==
The United States Army Corps of Engineers, which has three primary mission areas: Engineer Regiment, military construction, and civil works, publishes biannually a list of such locations and for this purpose states that "inland ports" are ports that are located on rivers and do not handle deep draft ship traffic. The list includes ports such as St. Louis, Cincinnati, Pittsburgh, Kansas City, and Memphis. A dense network of inland waterways including ports exists also in Europe (France, Germany, Poland, Russia, the United Kingdom and the Benelux countries), as well as in China and Brazil.

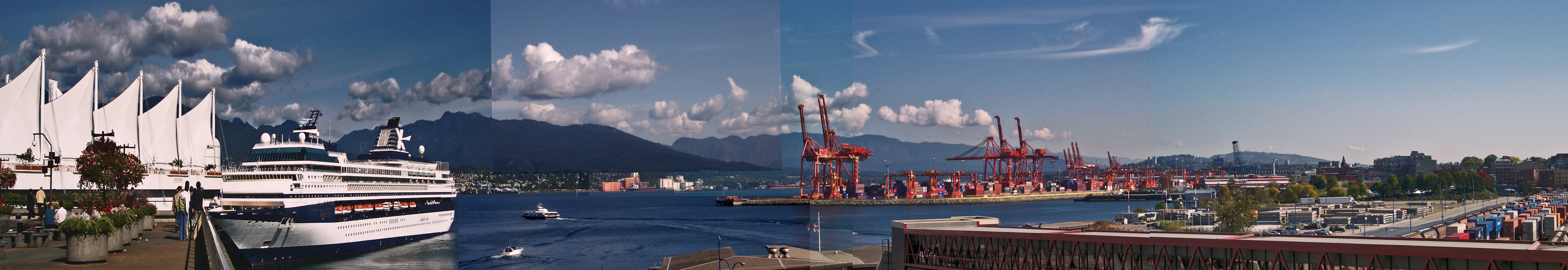
The Port of Vancouver, Canada's busiest port

== List of inland waterway ports ==
=== Africa ===
- Democratic Republic of the Congo : Port of Boma, Boma, Democratic Republic of the Congo, Congo River
- Democratic Republic of the Congo : Port of Ilebo, Ilebo, Democratic Republic of the Congo, Kasai River
- Democratic Republic of the Congo : Port of Matadi, Matadi, Democratic Republic of the Congo, Congo River
- Democratic Republic of the Congo : Port of Kinshasa, Kinshasa, Democratic Republic of the Congo, Congo River
- Democratic Republic of the Congo : Port of Kisangani, Kisangani, Democratic Republic of the Congo, Congo River
- Republic of the Congo : Port of Brazzaville, Brazzaville, Republic of the Congo
- Egypt : Inland port of Ismaïlia on the Suez Canal, Ismailia, Egypt
- Eswatini : Mlawula Inland Port, Mlawula, eSwatini (Proposed)
- Ghana : Boankra
- Kenya : Kisumu Inland Port, Kisumu, Kenya, on Lake Victoria
- Morocco : Kenitra Inland Port, Kenitra, Morocco, on Sebou River
- South Sudan : Juba Inland Port, Juba, South Sudan, on the White Nile River
- Tanzania : Bukoba Inland Port, Bukoba, Tanzania, on Lake Victoria
- Tanzania : Mwanza Inland Port, Mwanza, Tanzania, on Lake Victoria
- Tanzania : Kigoma Inland Port, Kigoma, Tanzania, on Lake Tanganyika
- Uganda : Bukasa Inland Port, Kira Town, Uganda, on Lake Victoria
- Uganda : Jinja Inland Port, Jinja, on Lake Victoria
- Uganda : Port Bell Inland Port, Port Bell, Uganda on Lake Victoria
- Zambia : Mpulungu Inland Port, Mpulungu, Zambia on Lake Tanganyika

=== Asia ===
==== Inland rivers ====
Port	Water body
===== Bangladesh =====
Port of Ashuganj	Meghna River, Ganges Delta
Port of Dhaka	Buriganga River, Ganges Delta
Port of Narayanganj	Shitalakshya River, Ganges Delta
Port of Khulna	Bhairab River, Ganges Delta
Port of Pangaon	Buriganga River, Ganges Delta
===== Cambodia =====
Phnom Penh Autonomous Port	Mekong River
===== China =====
Port of Nanjing	Yangtze River
Port of Wuhan	Yangtze River
Port of Chongqing	Yangtze River
Port of Suzhou	Yangtze River
Port of Nantong	Yangtze River
Port of Jiangyin	Yangtze River
Luzhou	Yangtze River
Yibin	Yangtze River
Yangzhou	Yangtze River, on China Grand Canal
Jining	China Grand Canal
Huai'an	China Grand Canal, on Huai River
Rongqi Port, Shunde	Bei River
Jiangmen	Xi River
Zhaoqing	Xi River
===== India =====
Port of Budge Budge	Ganges River
Port of Dhulian	Ganges River (Padma)
Dhubri Port	Brahmaputra River
Port of Farakka	Ganges River
Port of Jogigopa	Brahmaputra River
Haldia Inland Port	Hooghly River, Ganges Delta
Port of Kolaghat	Rupnarayan River
Port of Tamluk-Tamralipta	Rupnarayan River
Kolkata Inland Port	Hooghly River, Ganges Delta
Port of Maia	Ganges River (Padma)
Port of Pakur	Ganges River
Port of Patna	Ganges River
Port of Sahebganj	Ganges River
Port of Varanasi	Ganges River
===== Russia =====
Barnaul	Ob River, on Barnaulka River
Biysk	Biya River
Krasnoyarsk	Yenisei River
Yakutsk	Lena River
===== Thailand =====
Ha Chiang Port	Mekong River
Bangkok Port	Chao Praya River

=== Europe ===
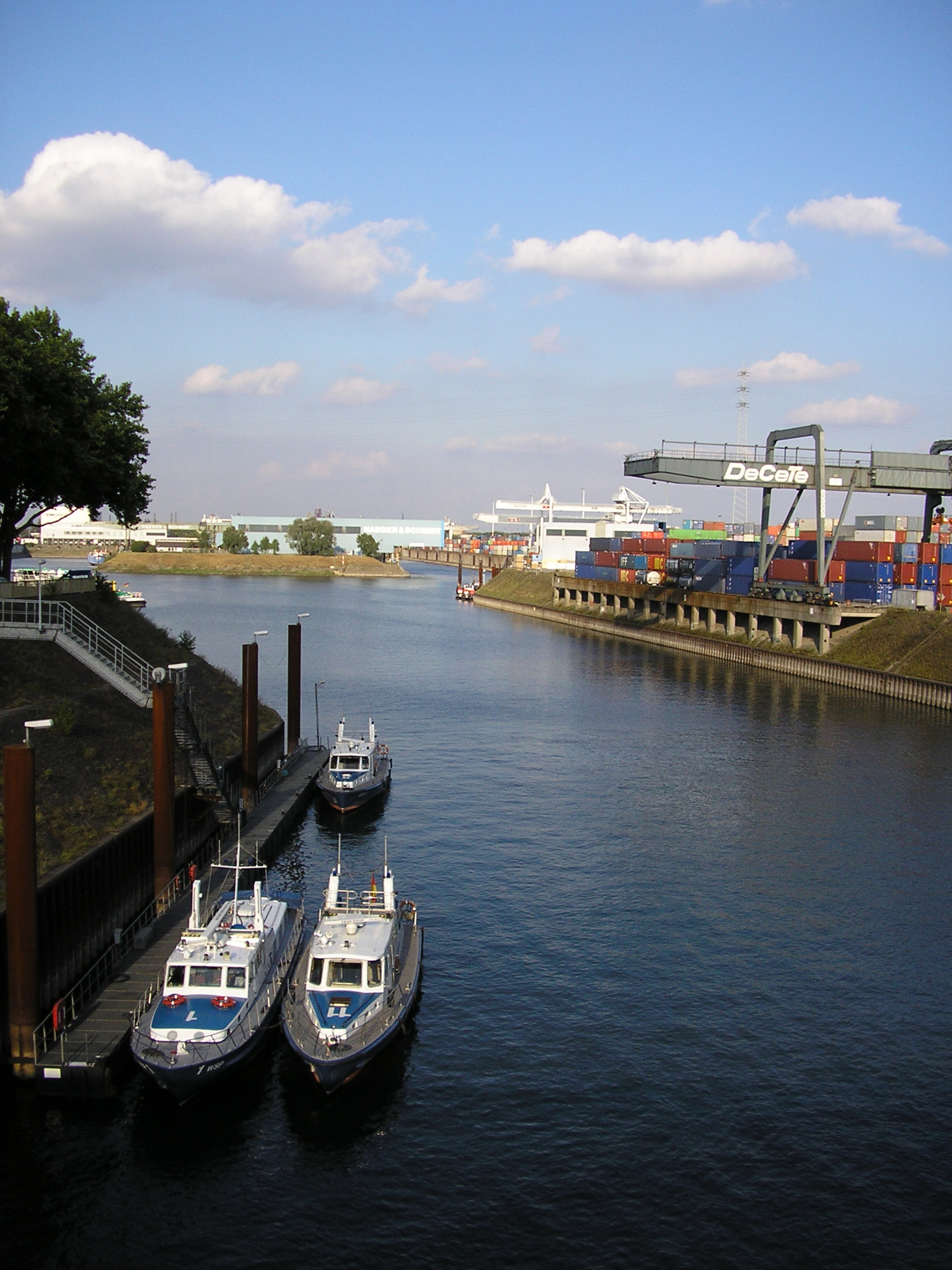
Port of Duisburg

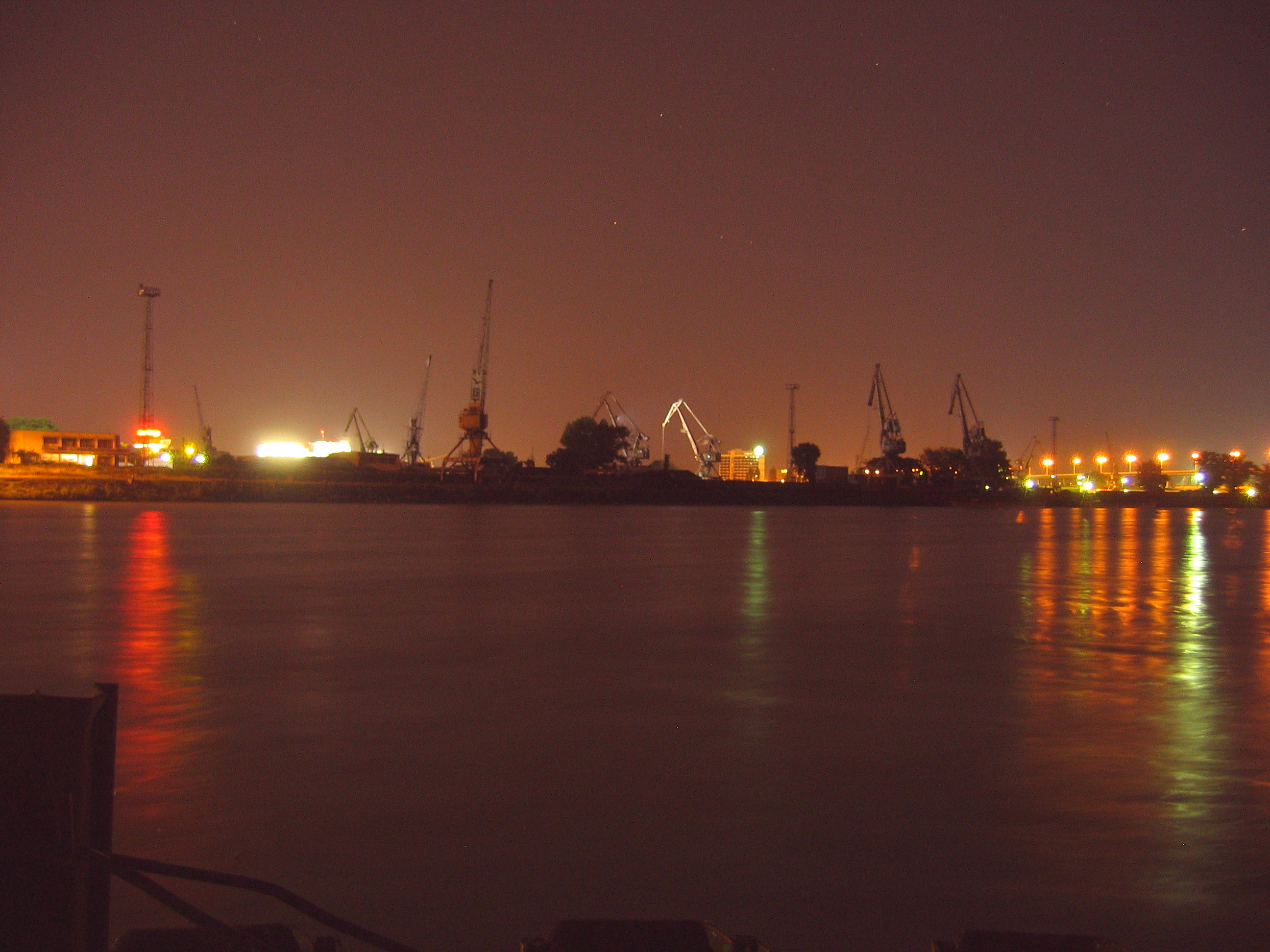
Port of Bratislava at night

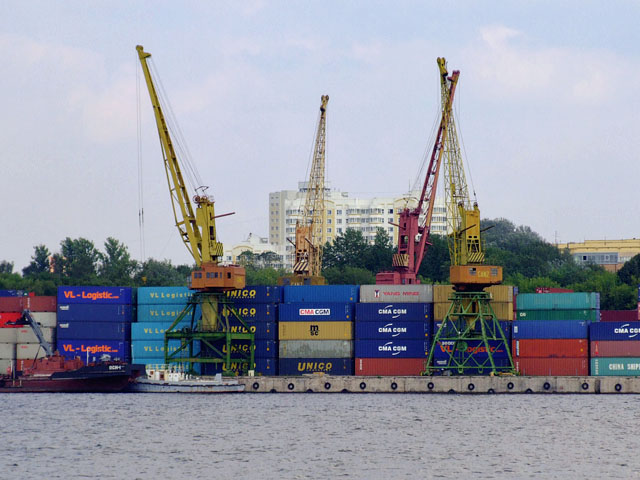
North River Port in Moscow

==== Inland rivers ====
Port	Water body	Coordinates	Website	Features and notes
===== Germany =====
Port of Duisburg	Rhine River	51.45°N 6.75°E	duisport.de	
Dortmund Port	Dortmund–Ems Canal	51.53°N 7.44°E	e-port-dortmund.de	
===== United Kingdom =====
Port of London	River Thames	51.50°N 0.05°W	pla.co.uk	
Port of Manchester (including Manchester Docks)	River Mersey	53.47°N 2.28°W	pla.co.uk	Was closed in 1982; being renovated as the Atlantic Gateway
Port of Bristol	River Avon	51.50°N 2.70°W	bristolport.co.uk	
Gloucester Docks	Gloucester and Sharpness Canal	51.86°N 2.25°W	visitgloucester.co.uk	
Goole	River Ouse and Aire and Calder Navigation	53.70°N 0.87°W	abports.co.uk	
Port of Wisbech	River Nene	52.67°N 0.16°E	portofwisbech.co.uk	
===== France =====
Autonomous Port of Paris	Seine	48.85°N 2.35°E		
Lyon	Rhone	45.71°N 4.83°E		

- United Kingdom : Runcorn Docks, England, United Kingdom, on the Manchester Ship Canal
- United Kingdom : Weston Point Docks, England, United Kingdom, on the Manchester Ship Canal
- Austria : Harbours in Vienna, Vienna, Austria, on Danube River
- Belgium : Port of Ghent, Ghent, Belgium, on Schelde River, Leie River and Ghent–Terneuzen Canal
- Belgium : Port of Liège, Liège, Belgium, on Meuse River and Meuse Canals
- Finland : Port of Lappeenranta, Lappeenranta, South Karelia, Finland, on Lake Saimaa.
- Hungary : Port of Budapest, Hungary, on Danube
- Ireland : Port of Waterford, Waterford, Ireland, on River Suir
- Luxembourg : Mertert on Moselle River.
- Netherlands : North- and East channel port Nijmegen, Gelderland, Netherlands, on Waal River.
- Poland : Port of Warsaw, Poland, on Vistula
- Russia : Port of Kolomna, Moscow Oblast, Russia, on Oka River
- Russia : Port of Moscow, North River Terminal, South River Terminal, Moscow, Russia, on Moskva River and Moscow Canal
- Serbia : Port of Belgrade, Belgrade, Serbia, on Danube
- Slovakia : Port of Bratislava, Bratislava, Slovakia on Danube River
- Spain : Port of Seville, Seville, Spain, on River Guadalquivir
- Sweden : Karlstad hamn Karlstad, Värmlands län, Sweden, on Klarälven.
- Switzerland : Port of Basel, Switzerland, on Rhine.
- Ukraine : Dnipro River Port, Dnipro, Ukraine, on Dnieper.
- Ukraine : Kyiv River Port, Ukraine, on Dnieper.

=== North America ===
==== Great Lakes ====
===== Canada =====
Port	Province	Water body	Coordinates	Website	Features and notes
Oshawa	ON	Lake Ontario	43.89°N 78.86°W		
Toronto	ON	Lake Ontario196n. mi. L	43.667°N 79.417°W	torontoport.com	CA rank: 16
Hamilton	ON	Lake Ontario	43.26°N 79.85°W	hamiltonport.ca	CA rank: 8
Windsor	ON	Detroit River	42.29°N 83.09°W	portwindsor.com	CA rank: 11
Sarnia	ON	St. Clair River	42.967°N 82.4°W		
Goderich	ON	Lake Huron	43.733°N 81.7°W		
Sault Ste. Marie	ON	Lake Superior	46.53°N 84.35°W		
Thunder Bay	ON	Lake Superior	48.42°N 89.28°W	Thunder Bay Port Authority	CA rank: 9
Kingston	ON	Lake Ontario / Saint Lawrence River			
Nanticoke	ON	Lake Erie			
===== United States =====
Port	State	Water body	Coordinates	Website	Features and notes
Oswego	NY	Lake Ontario	43.458°N 76.503°W		
Buffalo	NY	Lake Erie	42.878°N 78.895°W	portofbuffalo.com	US rank: 125
Erie	PA	Lake Erie283n. mi. L	42.152°N 80.068°W		
Conneaut	OH	Lake Erie	41.967°N 80.549°W		US rank: 79
Ashtabula	OH	Lake Erie	41.919°N 80.792°W		US rank: 64
Fairport Harbor	OH	Lake Erie	41.767°N 81.294°W		US rank: 116
Cleveland	OH	Lake Erie	41.479°N 81.672°W	portofcleveland.com	Cleveland-Cuyahoga County Port Authority, US rank: 47
Lorain	OH	Lake Erie	41.482°N 82.195°W		US rank: 143
Huron	OH	Lake Erie	41.405°N 82.544°W		US rank: 149
Sandusky	OH	Lake Erie	41.47°N 82.712°W		US rank: 98
Marblehead	OH	Lake Erie	41.53°N 82.709°W		US rank: 91
Toledo	OH	Lake Erie	41.663°N 83.508°W	toledoportauthority.org	Toledo-Lucas County Port Authority, US rank: 48
Monroe	MI	Lake Erie	41.915°N 83.391°W		US rank: 96
Detroit	MI	Detroit River	42.269°N 83.11°W	portdetroit.com	Detroit/Wayne County Port Authority, US rank: 42
Marine City	MI	St. Clair River	42.715°N 82.502°W		
St. Clair	MI	St. Clair River	42.827°N 82.494°W		US rank: 57
Marysville	MI	St. Clair River	42.827°N 82.481°W		
Alpena	MI	Lake Huron	45.056°N 83.422°W		US rank: 100
Stoneport Harbor	MI	Lake Huron	45.281°N 83.47°W		US rank: 68
Port Calcite	MI	Lake Huron	45.393°N 83.776°W		US rank: 73
Charlevoix	MI	Lake Michigan	45.313°N 85.243°W		
Manistee	MI	Lake Michigan	44.251°N 86.344°W		
Muskegon	MI	Lake Michigan	43.195°N 86.35°W		US rank: 117
Grand Haven	MI	Lake Michigan	43.067°N 86.236°W		US rank: 145
Port of Indiana-Burns Harbor	IN	Lake Michigan	41.643°N 87.155°W	portsofindiana.com/burns_harbor	US rank: 67
Gary	IN	Lake Michigan	41.612°N 87.325°W	U.S. Army Corps of Engineers Huntington District	US rank: 58
Buffington	IN	Lake Michigan	41.645°N 87.416°W		US rank: 128
Indiana Harbor	IN	Lake Michigan	41.676°N 87.445°W		US rank: 49
Chicago	IL	Lake Michigan	41.887°N 87.638°W	theportofchicago.com	US rank: 36
Milwaukee	WI	Lake Michigan	42.988°N 87.9°W	www.port.mil.wi.us milwaukee.gov	US rank: 95
Green Bay	WI	Lake Michigan	44.516°N 88.018°W	portofgreenbay.com	US rank: 108
Escanaba	MI	Lake Michigan	45.734°N 87.025°W		US rank: 75
Port Inland	MI	Lake Michigan	45.955°N 85.863°W		US rank: 76
Port Dolomite	MI	Lake Huron	45.985°N 84.275°W		US rank: 83
Drummond Island	MI	St Marys River	45.992°N 83.886°W		US rank: 130
Marquette	MI	Lake Superior	46.511°N 87.287°W		US rank: 135
Presque Isle Harbor	MI	Lake Superior	46.577°N 87.385°W		US rank: 54
Twin Ports of Duluth-Superior	MN, WI	Lake Superior	46.778°N 92.096°W	duluthport.com	US rank: 18
Two Harbors	MN	Lake Superior	47.004°N 91.663°W		US rank: 41
Silver Bay	MN	Lake Superior	47.284°N 91.276°W		US rank: 65
Taconite	MN	Lake Superior	47.523°N 90.929°W		
Sault Ste. Marie	MI	St. Marys River			

==== Rivers and inland ====
===== Canada =====
Port	Province	Water body	Coordinates	Website	Features and notes
Port-Cartier	QC	St Lawrence River	49.95°N 66.967°W	qcmines.com	
Baie-Comeau	QC	St Lawrence River	49.239°N 68.129°W	tc.gc.ca	
Saguenay	QC	Saguenay River	48.402°N 70.832°W	portsaguenay.ca	CA rank: 18
Québec	QC	St Lawrence River	46.813°N 71.219°W	portquebec.ca	CA rank: 5
Trois-Rivières	QC	St Lawrence River	46.35°N 72.55°W	porttr.com	CA rank: 15
Montréal	QC	St Lawrence Seaway, St Lawrence River On. mi. L 1000 n. mi. to deep water	45.509°N 73.554°W	port-montreal.com	CA rank: 4
===== United States =====
Port	State	Water body	Coordinates	Website	Features and notes
Minneapolis	MN	upper Mississippi River, 839 mi. R	44.994°N 93.274°W		Closed
St. Paul	MN	upper Mississippi River, 839 mi. L	44.952°N 93.062°W		US rank: 74
Rock Island	IL	upper Mississippi River, 483 mi. L	41.489°N 90.567°W		
St. Louis and East St. Louis	MO, IL	upper Mississippi River 180 mi. R, Missouri River 0 mi. R	38.57°N 90.23°W	missouriports.org	US rank: 24
Cairo	IL	Mississippi River lower 954 mi. L, upper 0 mi. L; Ohio River 981 mi. R	37.013°N 89.167°W		
Memphis	TN	Mississippi River, 735 mi. L	35.182°N 90.062°W	portofmemphis.com	US rank: 45
Helena	AR	Mississippi River, 663 mi. R	34.522°N 90.583°W		US rank: 120
Greenville	MS	Mississippi River, 532 mi. R	33.359°N 91.127°W		US rank: 90
Vicksburg	MS	Mississippi River, 436 mi. L	32.335°N 90.901°W		US rank: 81
Natchez	MS	Mississippi River, 363 mi. L	31.554°N 91.388°W		
Baton Rouge	LA	Mississippi River, 228 mi. R	30.423°N 91.199°W	portgbr.com	US rank: 14
New Orleans	LA	Mississippi River, 103 mi. L	29.914°N 90.085°W	portno.com	US rank: 7
Sioux City	IA	Missouri River, 732 mi. L	42.489°N 96.418°W		
Lewiston	ID	Columbia River	46.434°N 116.935°W	portoflewiston.com	
Kansas City	MO	Missouri River, 370 mi. R	39.115°N 94.608°W	kcportauthority.com	US rank: 52
Pittsburgh	PA	Allegheny, Monongahela, Ohio rivers, 0 mi.	40.442°N 80.016°W	port.pittsburgh.pa.us	US rank: 22
Huntington	WV, KY, OH	Ohio River, 309 mi. L, elev. 515 ft.	38.434°N 82.42°W		US rank: 10
Cincinnati	OH	Ohio River, 472 mi. R	39.094°N 84.505°W		US rank: 43
Louisville	KY	Ohio River, 604 mi. L	38.264°N 85.761°W		US rank: 66
Port of Indiana-Jeffersonville	IN	Ohio River	portsofindiana.com/jeffersonville		
Tell City Riverport	IN	Ohio River, 727 mi. R	37.938°N 86.768°W	www.pcrailport.net	
Port of Indiana-Mount Vernon	IN	Ohio River, 829 mi. R	37.922°N 87.875°W	portsofindiana.com/mount_vernon	US rank: 69
Nashville	TN	Cumberland River	36.165°N 86.775°W		US rank: 86
Chattanooga	TN	Tennessee River	35.024°N 85.327°W		US rank: 105
Birmingport	AL	Black Warrior River – Locust Fork			
Guntersville	AL	Tennessee River	34.374°N 86.288°W		US rank: 110
Decatur	AL	Tennessee River	34.581°N 86.983°W	decaturtransit.com	
Tuscaloosa – Northport	AL	Black Warrior River			
Montgomery	AL	Alabama River			
Tulsa	OK	Arkansas River, Kerr/McClellan Navigational Channel	36.218°N 95.74°W	tulsaport.com Tulsa USACE: Kerr-McClellan Arkansas River Navigation System	
Shreveport-Bossier	LA	Red River	32.515°N 93.74°W	portsb.com	
Albany	NY	Hudson River	42.643°N 73.748°W	portofalbany.com	US rank: 63
Port Columbus	GA	Chattahoochee River	32.45°N 84.983°W		
Port Bainbridge	GA	Lake Seminole	30.905°N 84.571°W	gaports.com	
Walla Walla	WA	Columbia, Snake rivers	46.065°N 118.33°W	portwallawalla.com	
Portland	OR	Columbia, Willamette rivers	45.561223°N 122.710922°W	portofportland.com	U.S. Rank: 28
Sacramento	CA	Sacramento River	38.556°N 121.469°W	portofsacramento.com	
Stockton	CA	San Joaquin River	37.953°N 121.316°W	portofstockton.com	US rank: 111
Port of Philadelphia	PA	Delaware River			
Port of Richmond	VA	James River			

=== South America ===
- Argentina : San Lorenzo-Puerto General San Martín Port Complex, San Lorenzo and Puerto General San Martín, Santa Fe, Argentina, on Paraná River
- Argentina : Port of Rosario, Rosario, Santa Fe, Argentina, on Paraná River
- Argentina : Port of San Nicolás de los Arroyos, San Nicolás de los Arroyos, Buenos Aires (province), Argentina, on Paraná River
- Bolivia : Puerto Aguirre, Puerto Quijarro, Bolivia, on Tamengo Canal
- Bolivia : Puerto Busch, Bolivia, on Paraguay River
- Bolivia : Port of Guayaramerín, Guayaramerín, Bolivia, on Mamoré River
- Bolivia : Port of Riberalta, Riberalta, Bolivia on Madre de Dios River and Beni River
- Brazil : Port of Porto Alegre, Porto Alegre, Rio Grande do Sul, Brazil, on Guaíba Lake
- Brazil : Port of Porto Velho, Porto Velho, Rondônia, Brazil, on Madeira River
- Brazil : Port of Manaus, Manaus, Amazonas, Brazil, on Rio Negro
- Brazil : Port of Santana, Santana, Amapá, Brazil, on Amazon River
- Brazil : Port of Santarém, Santarém, Pará, Brazil, on Tapajós and Amazon rivers
- Paraguay : Port of Asunción, Asunción, Paraguay, on Paraguay River
- Paraguay : Port of Encarnación, Encarnación, Itapúa Department, Paraguay, on Paraná River
- Paraguay : Port of San Antonio, San Antonio, Central Department, Paraguay, on Paraguay River
- Paraguay : Port of Villeta, Villeta, Central Department, Paraguay, on Paraguay River

== See also ==
- Dry port
- Sea port

== Notes ==
- Canada ranking from Transport Canada.
- Saint Lawrence Seaway distances from Seaway Handbook.
- United States ranking from American Association of Port Authorities.
- Upper Mississippi River distances from U.S. Army Corps of Engineers.
- Lower Mississippi River distances from U.S. Army Corps of Engineers.
- Ohio River distances from U.S. Army Corps of Engineers.
- Missouri River distances from U.S. Army Corps of Engineers.
- Mississippi Basin ports marked.
- Some ports were part of the Dubai Ports World controversy.
