= Rosario Board of Trade =

Non-profit in Santa Fe province, Argentina

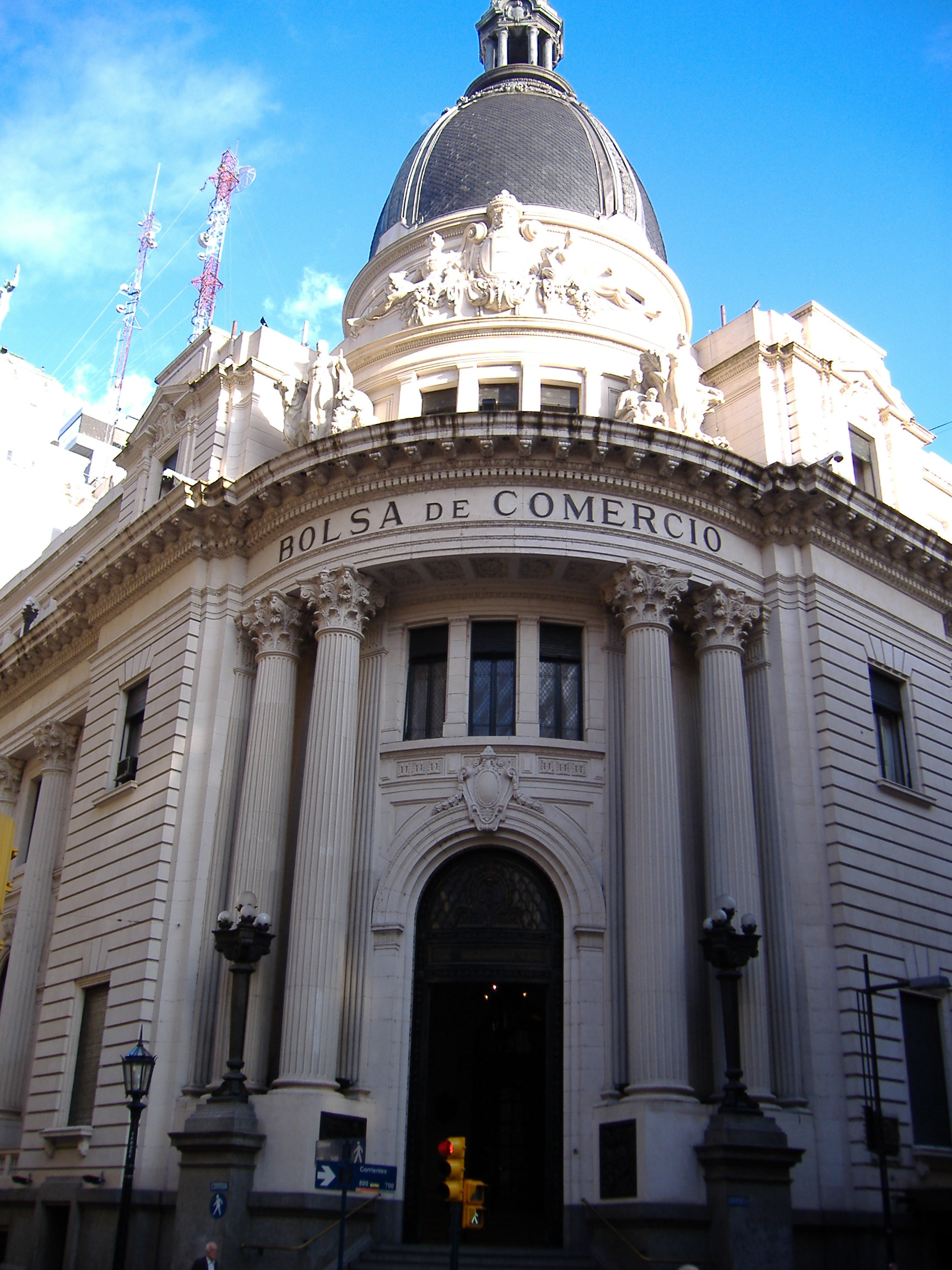
The original Rosario Stock Exchange

The Rosario Board of Trade (Spanish: Bolsa de Comercio de Rosario, BCR) is a non-profit making association based in Rosario, in the Province of Santa Fe, Argentina. Founded on August 18, 1884, it serves as a forum for the conduct of trade negotiations in several markets including grain, oilseed, agricultural products and their by-products, as well as securities and other assets.

== Grain market ==
The Physical Grain Market (Mercado Físico de Granos) of the BCR is the most important in Argentina in terms of its volume of operations, and provides reference prices for the national and international markets. Most of the country's production of cereals and oilseeds is traded within it, especially soybean. The region around Rosario contains more than 80% of the vegetable oil industry of Argentina and its ports, (Rosario and San Lorenzo-Puerto San Martín), handle more than 90% of the Argentine export of soybean and its derivatives. The Board of Trade additionally operates a complex of laboratories which analyze and provide quality certifications for samples of agricultural products, soil and water.

== Futures exchange ==
The Rosario Futures Exchange (ROFEX, Mercado a Término de Rosario) has traditionally been a futures exchange for commodities and, in more recent times, for financial products such as exchange rate and interest rate options. Its negotiated volume (especially in forward contracts over dollars) makes ROFEX the largest futures market in the country.

== Stock exchange ==
The Rosario Stock Exchange (Mercado de Valores de Rosario, abbreviated MerVaRos) is known as Mercado Argentino de Valores, after the merger with the Mendoza Stock Exchange.

== Livestock market ==
The Rosario Livestock Market (Mercado Ganadero de Rosario, abbreviated Rosgan) is an important Argentine livestock auction market, notably for cattle.

== History ==
Operating in a landmark Beaux-Arts headquarters designed by Raúl Rivero in 1926, the exchange had new offices built during the 1990s. Designed by architect Mario Roberto Álvarez, the new building was completed in 1998.
