= List of ports in Argentina =

The following is a list of 20 major ports in Argentina.

== On the Paraná River ==
1. San Lorenzo-Puerto General San Martín Port Complex (San Lorenzo and Puerto General San Martín, Santa Fe)
2. Port of San Nicolás de los Arroyos (San Nicolás de los Arroyos, Buenos Aires)
3. Port of Zárate (Zárate, Buenos Aires)
4. Port of Campana (Campana, Buenos Aires)

== On the Río de la Plata ==
1. Port of Buenos Aires (Buenos Aires City)
2. Port of Dock Sud (Greater Buenos Aires)
3. Port of La Plata (La Plata, capital of Buenos Aires Province)

== On the Atlantic Ocean ==
(from North to South)

1. Port of Mar del Plata (Mar del Plata, Buenos Aires Province)
2. Port of Quequén (Necochea, Buenos Aires Province)
3. Port Belgrano (Puerto Belgrano, Argentine Navy Base, Buenos Aires Province)
4. Puerto Rosales (Punta Alta, Buenos Aires Province)
5. Port of Ingeniero White (Bahía Blanca, Buenos Aires Province)
6. Port Galván (Bahía Blanca, Buenos Aires Province)
7. Port of San Antonio Oeste (San Antonio Oeste, Río Negro)
8. Port Madryn (Puerto Madryn, Chubut Province)
9. Port of Comodoro Rivadavia (Comodoro Rivadavia, Chubut Province)
10. Port Caleta Paula (Caleta Olivia, Santa Cruz Province)
11. Port Deseado (Puerto Deseado, Santa Cruz Province)
12. Port San Julian (Puerto San Julian, Santa Cruz Province)
13. Port of Río Gallegos (Argentine Navy Base, on the estuary of Río Gallegos, Santa Cruz Province)
14. Port of Ushuaia (Ushuaia, Tierra del Fuego Province)
