= Port of Liège =

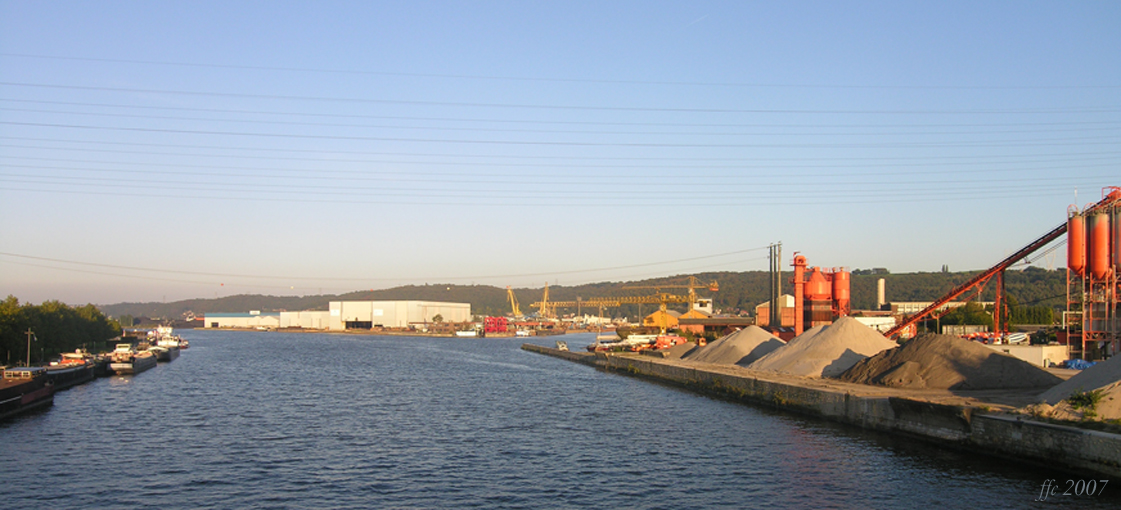
- Albert Canal and dock at the port entrance, 2007
- Click on the map for a fullscreen view

Location
- Country: Belgium
- Location: Liège, Liège
- Coordinates: 50.66°N 5.636°E
- UN/LOCODE: BELGG

Details
- Opened: 1937 (Albert Canal)
- Land area: 370 ha (910 acres)
- Chief Executive Officer: Emile-Louis Bertrand

Statistics
- Annual cargo tonnage: ▲13.537 million tonnes (2014)
- Annual container volume: ▲31,939 TEU (2014)
- Annual revenue: ▲€ 3.735 million (2014)
- Website www.portdeliege.be

The Port of Liège is a Belgian inland port in Liège in the Province of Liège in Wallonia at the Meuse river and at the Albert Canal in the heart of Europe. Liège is the third largest inland port in Europe after Duisburg and Paris. It also has direct links to Antwerp and Rotterdam via its canals. Stretching over a distance of 26 kilometers and comprising 32 port areas, it covers 3.7 square kilometers.
