= Port of Duisburg =

Port in Germany

Port of Duisburg Duisburger Hafen
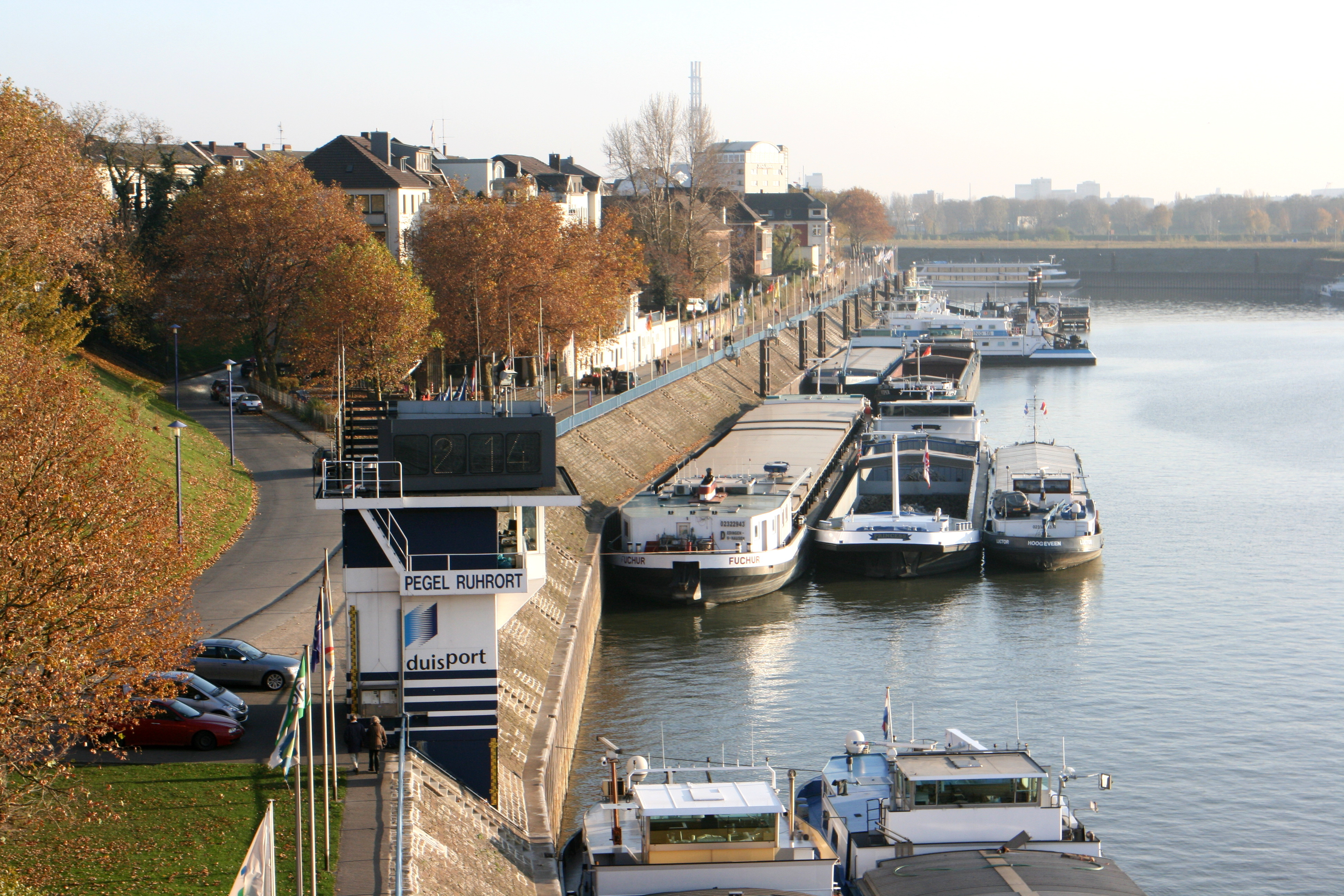
- At the Duisburg Ruhrort gauge
- Interactive map of Port of Duisburg; Duisburger Hafen

Location
- Country: Germany
- Location: Duisburg
- Coordinates: 51°27′09″N 6°45′36″E

Details
- Opened: 1665 by Guilds of coastal sailors
- Operated by: Duisburg Port AG
- Owned by: City of Duisburg
- Type of Harbor: inlandport
- Land area: 10 km^{2} (3.9 sq mi)
- Size: 15 km^{2} (5.8 sq mi)
- No. of wharfs: lll

Statistics
- Vessel arrivals: ▲25,000 (2026)
- Annual cargo tonnage: ▲59 million tonnes (2026)
- Annual container volume: ▲4.2 million TEU (2026)
- Passenger traffic: ▲150,000 passengers (2026)
- Annual revenue: ▲€350 milion (2026)
- Main trades: Energy & Coal, Steel & Metal, Chemical, Automotive and Consumer Goods
- Website

The Port of Duisburg (German: Duisburger Hafen) is an inland port on the confluence of the Ruhr and Rhine rivers in Duisburg which is 210 kilometres (130 mi; 110 nmi) from the mouth of the Rhine on the North Sea. It is considered the largest inland port in Europe. With a total area of 10 km^{2}, the actual port area stretches from the docks at the mouth of the Ruhr along the Rhine upstream to Duisburg-Rheinhausen.

The Duisburg Port AG is the owner and management company of the Port of Duisburg. The Duisport Group offers full-service packages for the port and logistics location in the areas of infrastructure and superstructure, including business development management. Furthermore, its subsidiaries provide logistics services such as the development and optimization of transport and logistics chains, rail freight services, building management, and packaging logistics.

== Location and function ==
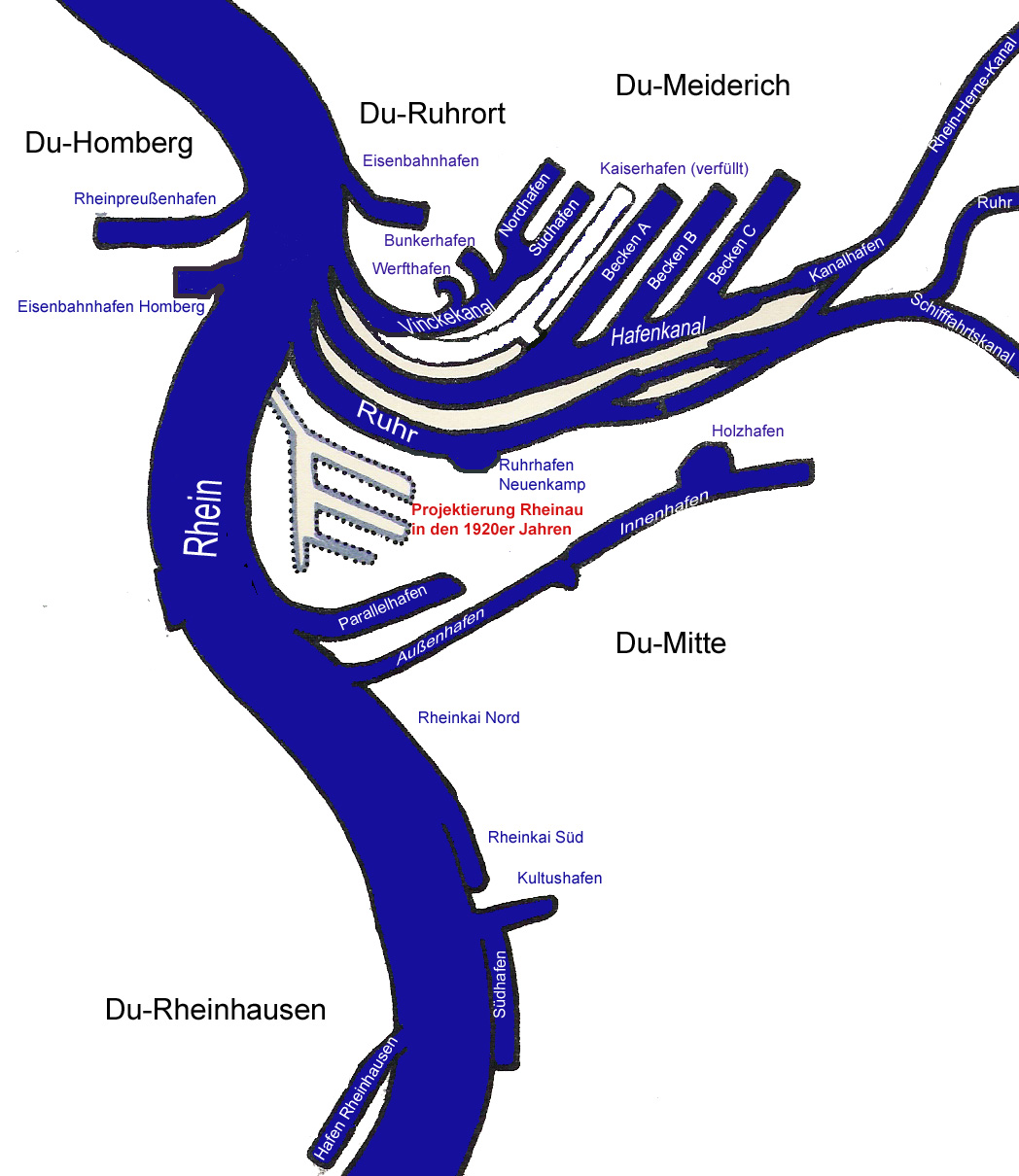
Overview of the Duisburg ports

The 21 public dock basins have a water surface area of over 180 hectares. The quayside length is 40 km, of which 15 km are transshipment shoreline with rail access. Approximately 1.5 million m^{2} of covered storage space is available. Total cargo throughput in 2009 was 44.4 million tons, of which 12.1 million tons were handled by ship and 10.7 million tons by rail. Together with rail and truck traffic, and including the eight private industrial docks in the north and south of the city, the port recorded a total throughput of 133 million tons in 2016 (2015: 129 million tons). The Port of Duisburg is the hinterland hub in the pan-European waterway network for the seaports of Amsterdam, Emden, Rotterdam, Antwerp, and Hamburg. In these North Sea ports, goods are transshipped from seagoing vessels to inland waterway vessels and largely transported via Duisburg to the European hinterland. Conversely, there are also direct shipping connections from Duisburg via the Rhine and Meuse rivers to overseas destinations. The Port of Duisburg therefore also serves as Germany's southernmost seaport. Many shipping companies operating in the port maintain river-sea connections to a total of approximately one hundred European ports. Around two million tons of cargo are handled annually on approximately 2,000 river-going seagoing vessels.

Around 250 companies are located in the Port of Duisburg. Approximately 36,000 jobs, 11% of all jobs in Duisburg, depend on the port. The total added value associated with the port amounts to more than €2.2 billion. The Duisport Group, founded in 2000 and consisting of Duisburger Hafen AG and other subsidiaries, employs around 1,600 people. The group is currently owned equally by the State of North Rhine-Westphalia, the City of Duisburg, and the Federal Republic of Germany. The Federal Government announced at the end of August 2011 its intention to sell its stake. Around half a billion euros are invested annually.

In addition, two of Germany's six church ships sail in the port of Duisburg, namely one each from the Catholic and Protestant churches.

== History ==
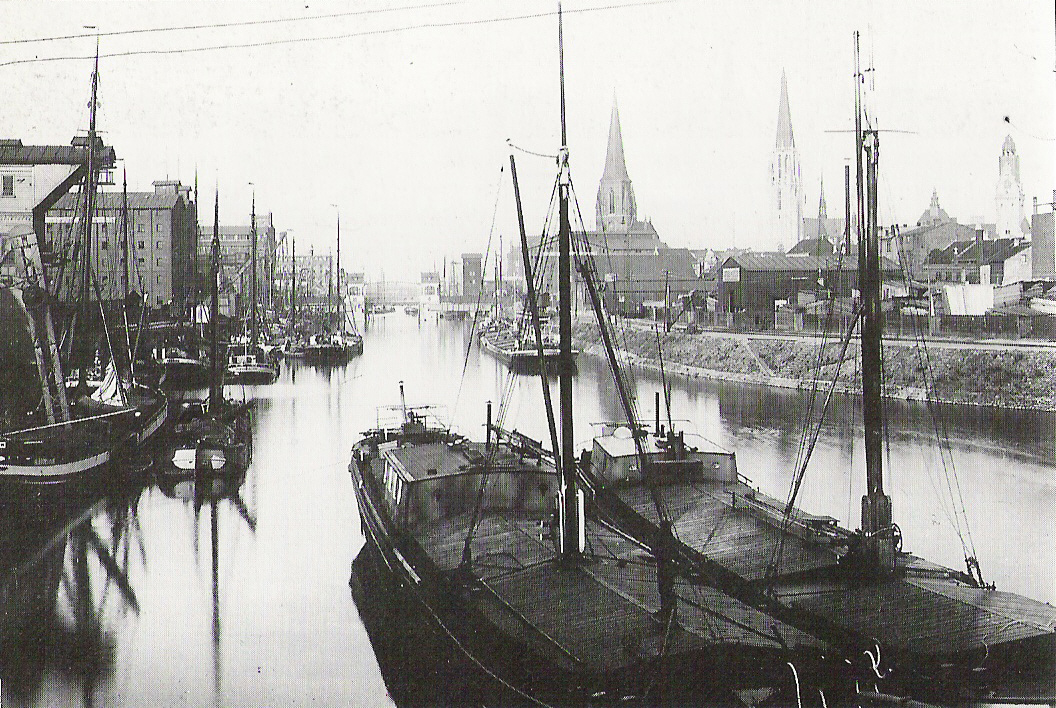
Duisburg Inner Harbour around 1900

With the construction of a canal connecting Duisburg to the Rhine beginning in 1826, Rhine trade regained considerable importance. From 1844 onward, the connection to the Ruhr enabled Duisburg to participate in the growing coal trade. As the port expanded to handle timber, ore, and especially grain, Duisburg's port became the second-largest Rhine port after Ruhrort.

Increasing competition between the ports of Duisburg and Ruhrort led, in 1905, to the merger of the ports, followed soon after by the unification of the cities of Duisburg, Ruhrort, and Meiderich.

== Incidents ==
On March 31, 2016, an explosion occurred during work on the inland tanker Julius Rütgers at the Ruhrort shipyard, killing three workers.

A large fire broke out on the scrap metal island on August 10, 2023.
