= Port of Nanjing =

Large inland port in China

Coordinates: 32°10′08″N 118°57′00″E

Port of Nanjing 南京港
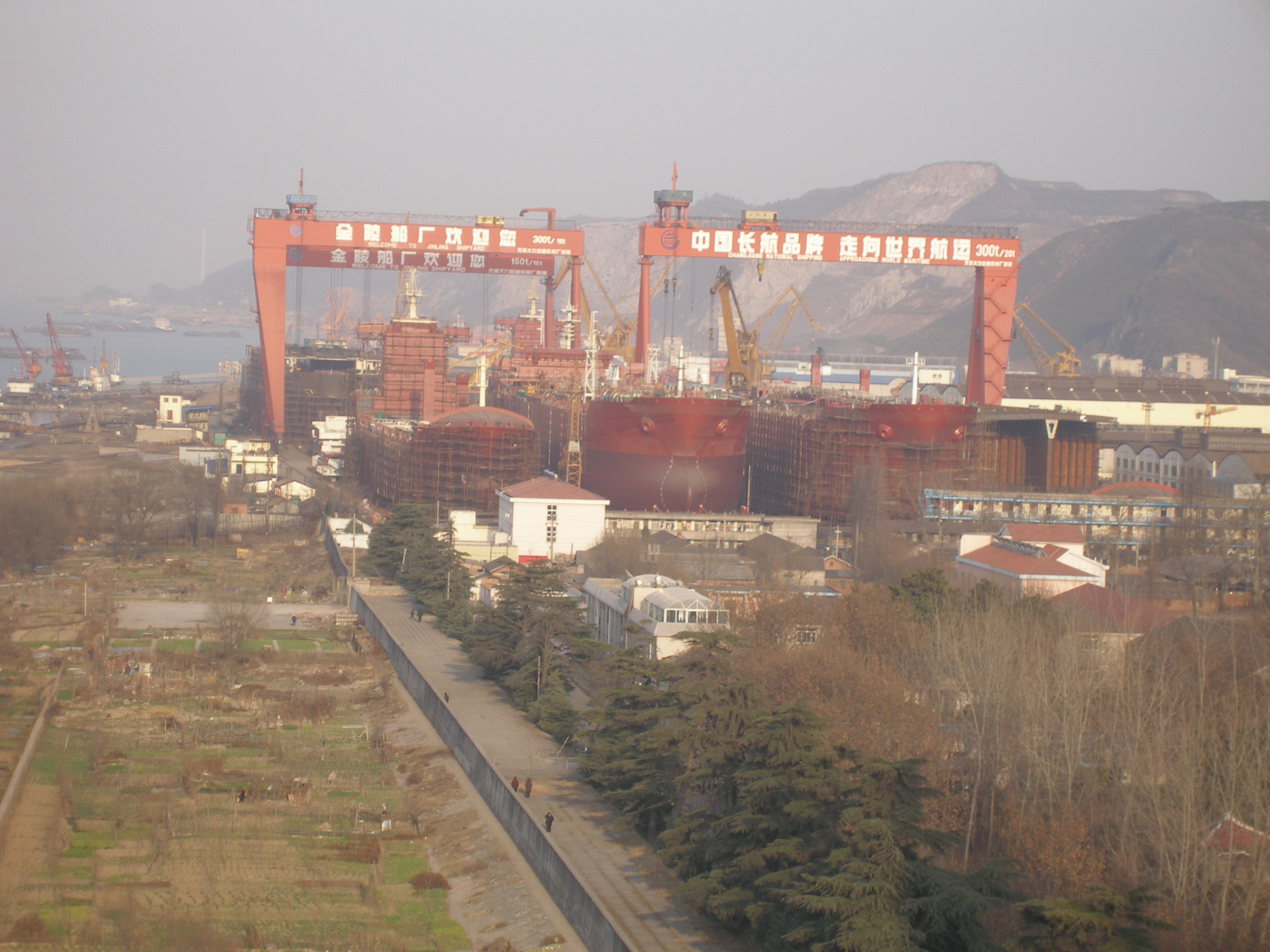
- Interactive map of Port of Nanjing 南京港

Location
- Country: China
- Location: Yangtze River, Nanjing, Jiangsu Province

Details
- Type of harbour: Inland
- No. of berths: 257 (44 over 10000 DWT)
- UN/LOCODE: CNNJG
- Fairway depth: 12.5m

Statistics
- Annual cargo tonnage: 191,970,000 t (2012)
- Website http://www.njp.com.cn

The Port of Nanjing (Chinese: 南京港, SZSE: 002040) is located in Nanjing, Jiangsu Province, China, and is the largest inland port in the world (depending on how ports in the Yangtze Delta are classified), with throughput reaching 191 million tons of cargo in 2012. Nanjing Port has a long history reaching back to A.D 229, when it became a major seaport. It is situated in the lower reaches of the Yangtze River, just before the start of the Yangtze Delta. The Port has authority over 208 km of Yangtze River shoreline, 110 km in the North Shore and 98 km in the South Shore. As of 2010, it operated six public ports and three industrial ports.

== See also ==
- List of ports in China
