= San Lorenzo, Santa Fe =

San Lorenzo
- City and Port
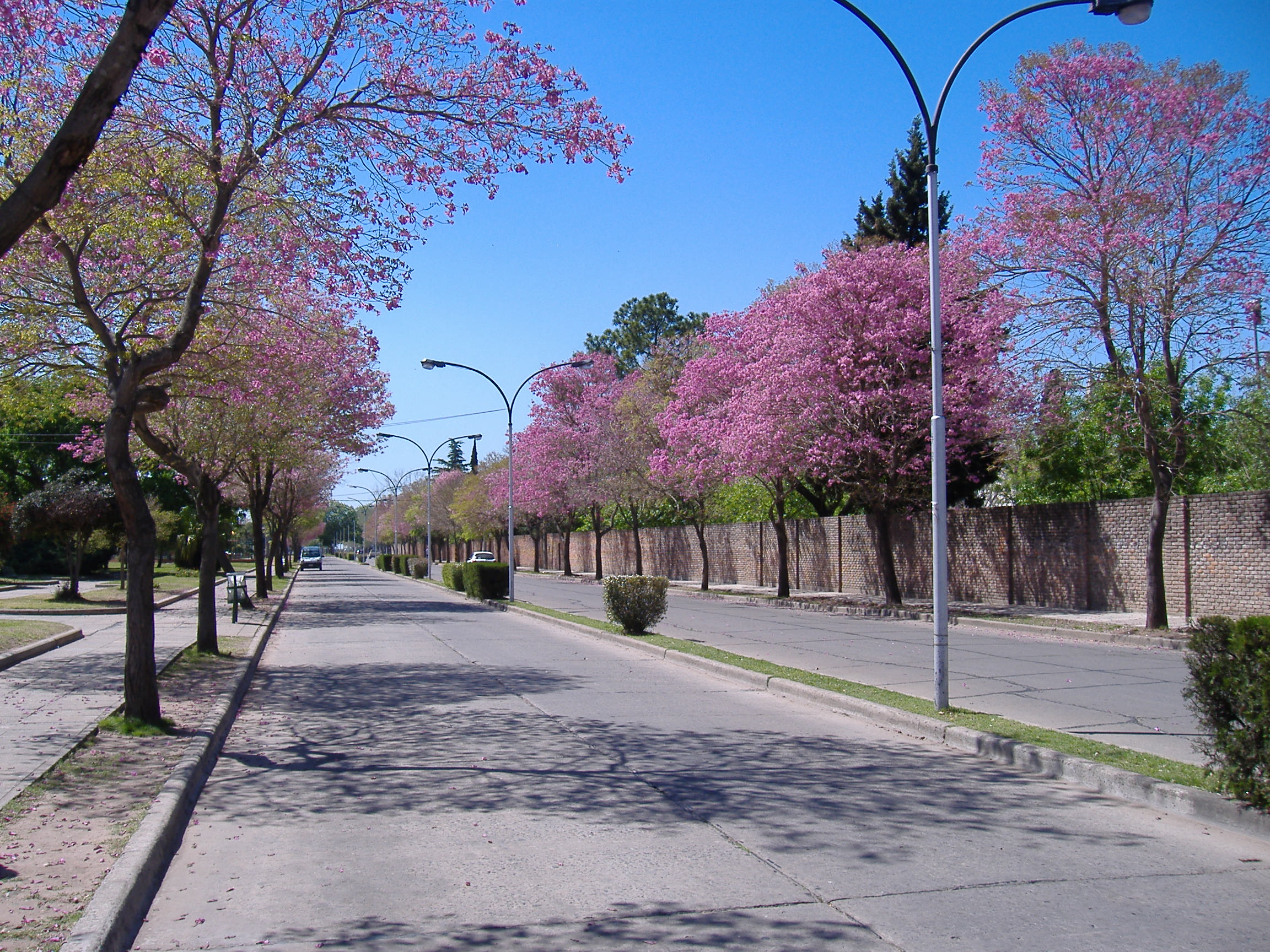

- Location of San Lorenzo in Argentina
- Coordinates: 32°45′S 60°44′W
- Country: Argentina
- Province: Santa Fe
- Department: San Lorenzo

Government
  - Intendant: Leonardo Raimundo (Radical Civic Union)

Area
  - Total: 39 km^{2} (15 sq mi)
- Elevation: 40 m (130 ft)

Population (2010 census)
  - Total: 46,239
- Time zone: UTC−3 (ART)
- CPA base: S2200
- Dialing code: +54 3476

San Lorenzo (Spanish pronunciation: [san loˈɾenso]) is a city in the south of the Province of Santa Fe, Argentina, located 23 km north of Rosario, on the western shore of the Paraná River, and forming one end of the Greater Rosario metropolitan area. It is the head town of the San Lorenzo Department, and it has about 46,000 inhabitants according to the 2010 census [INDEC].

== History ==
Though generally accepted as 1796, San Lorenzo has no certain foundation date, as different historical texts refer to different dates. However, the Municipal Council finally decided in 1984 to settle on 6 May 1796, the date when Franciscan friars came and started the evangelization of the area.

The city was the stage of the Battle of San Lorenzo on 3 February 1813, where troops loyal to the Spanish Crown were defeated by local revolutionaries under General José de San Martín. The 18th century San Carlos Monastery has a museum devoted to this battle, the first in the Argentine War of Independence, it is also the birthplace of Argentine footballer Javier Mascherano.

== Geography and industries ==
San Lorenzo is located at the end of the "Industrial corridor" of the Argentine littoral, and hosts processing industries (edible oil, flour), as well as ceramics factories and petrochemical plants. San Lorenzo's port and that of nearby Puerto General San Martín are among the largest export outlets in Argentina for primary products (soybean, wheat and maize).

== Port of San Lorenzo ==
San Lorenzo remains among the most prominent ports of Argentina, primarily for the loading of grain. Located on the western banks of Parana river, about 14 miles from Rosario, the port complex comprise three cities: San Lorenzo, Puerto San Martin and Timbues. These ports collectively handle mainly cargoes of grain, vegetable oil, refined products and crude.

This also includes the San Lorenzo-Puerto General San Martin Port Complex, an area comprising numerous ports along the Parana river. A number of these berths are private.

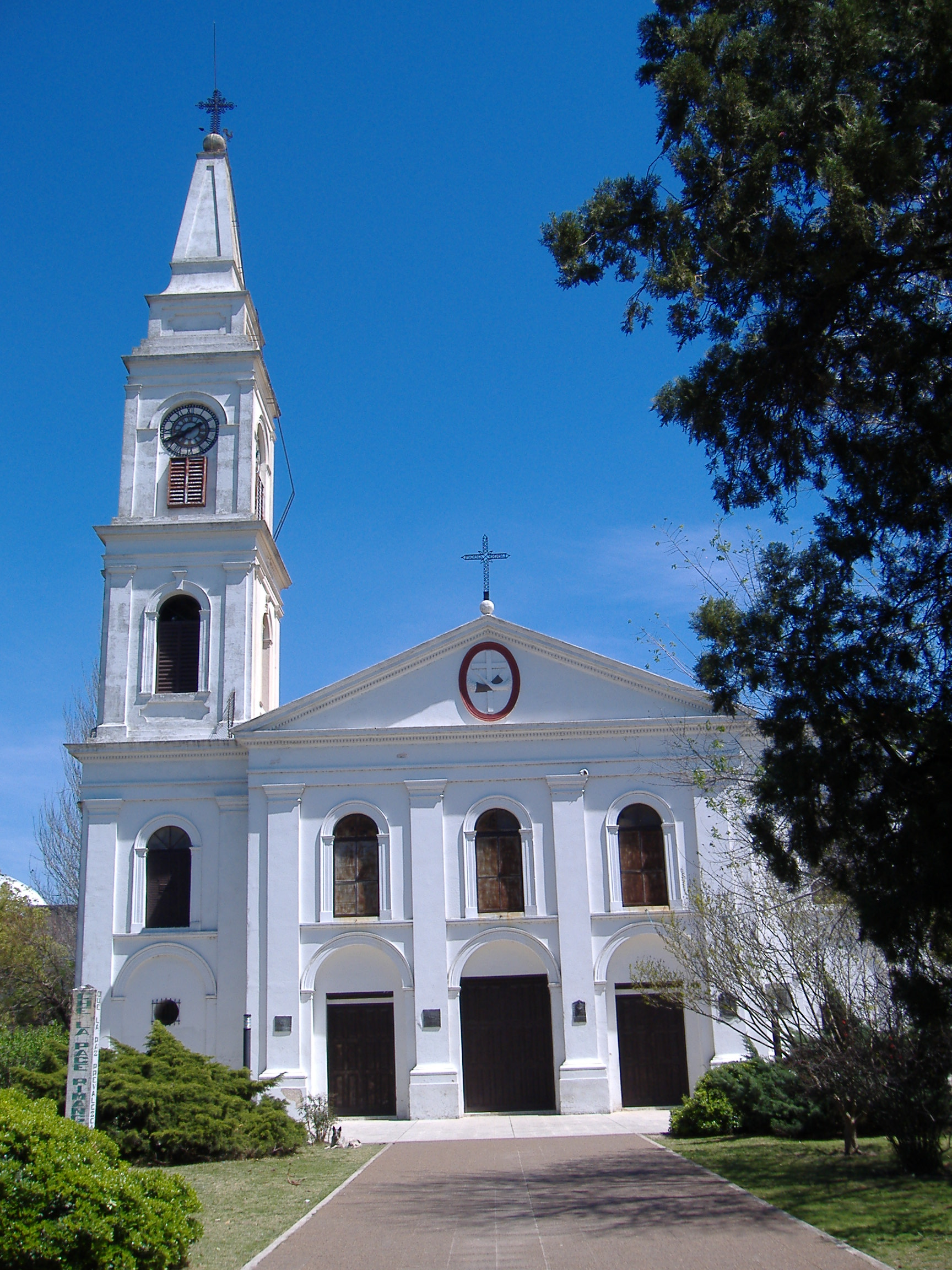
Historic San Carlos Convent.
