= Kolkata Inland Port =

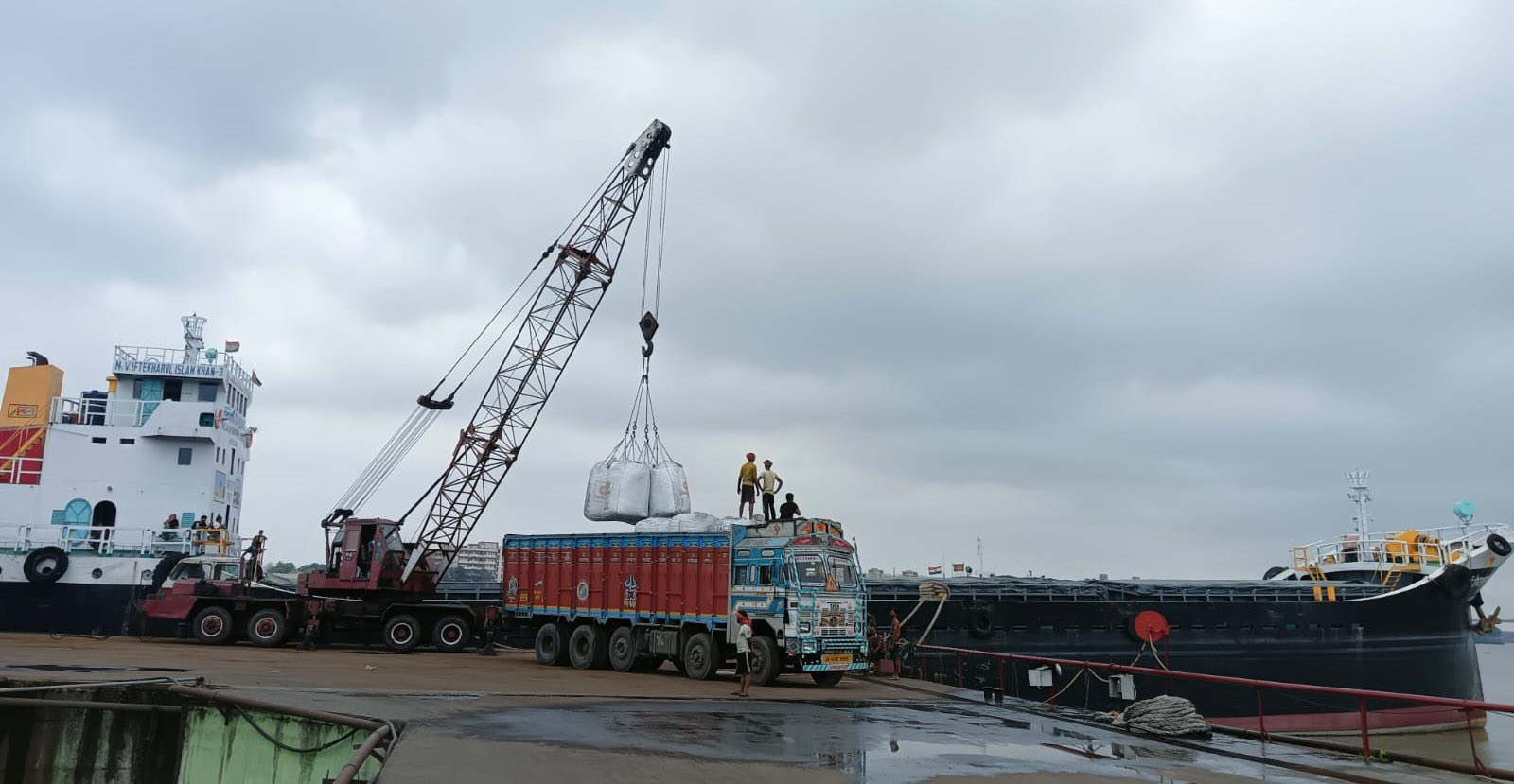
- Hard coke is being loaded on the Bangladesh bound ship at Garden Reach Jetty–2 of the Kolkata Inland Port
- Interactive map of Kolkata Inland Port

Location
- Country: India
- Location: Garden Reach, Kolkata, West Bengal
- Coordinates: 22.5470633°N 88.3010365°E

Details
- Opened: 2013; 13 years ago
- Operated by: Summit Alliance Port East Gateway (India)
- Owned by: Inland Waterways Authority of India (IWAI)
- Type of harbour: Inland Port
- No. of berths: 3
- Draft depth: 5 metres (16 ft)

Statistics
- Annual cargo tonnage: 5,79,539.22 metric ton (2022–2023)
- Annual revenue: ₹4,01,81,944.29 (2022–2023)
- Net income: ₹72,19,755.15 (2022–2023)

Kolkata Inland Port (officially known as Kolkata Terminal) is an inland port. The port is located on the eastern bank of the Hooghly River in the Garden Reach area of Kolkata. It was developed by Inland Waterways Authority of India (IWAI) in 2013. It has a total area of 10 acres and a river front of 400 metres (1,300 ft) in length. The port consists of three jetties, which are one permanent RCC jetty and two pontoon jetties. The port mainly handles barges; the depth of water at the permanent jetty is 5 metres (16 ft).

The port is connected by inland waterways with the inland ports of North India, West Bengal and North East India and neighboring country Bangladesh. The port mainly transports General Cargo and container Cargo; according to the data for the financial year 2022–23, the port was able to handle 579,539.22 metric tonnes of cargoes.

== History ==
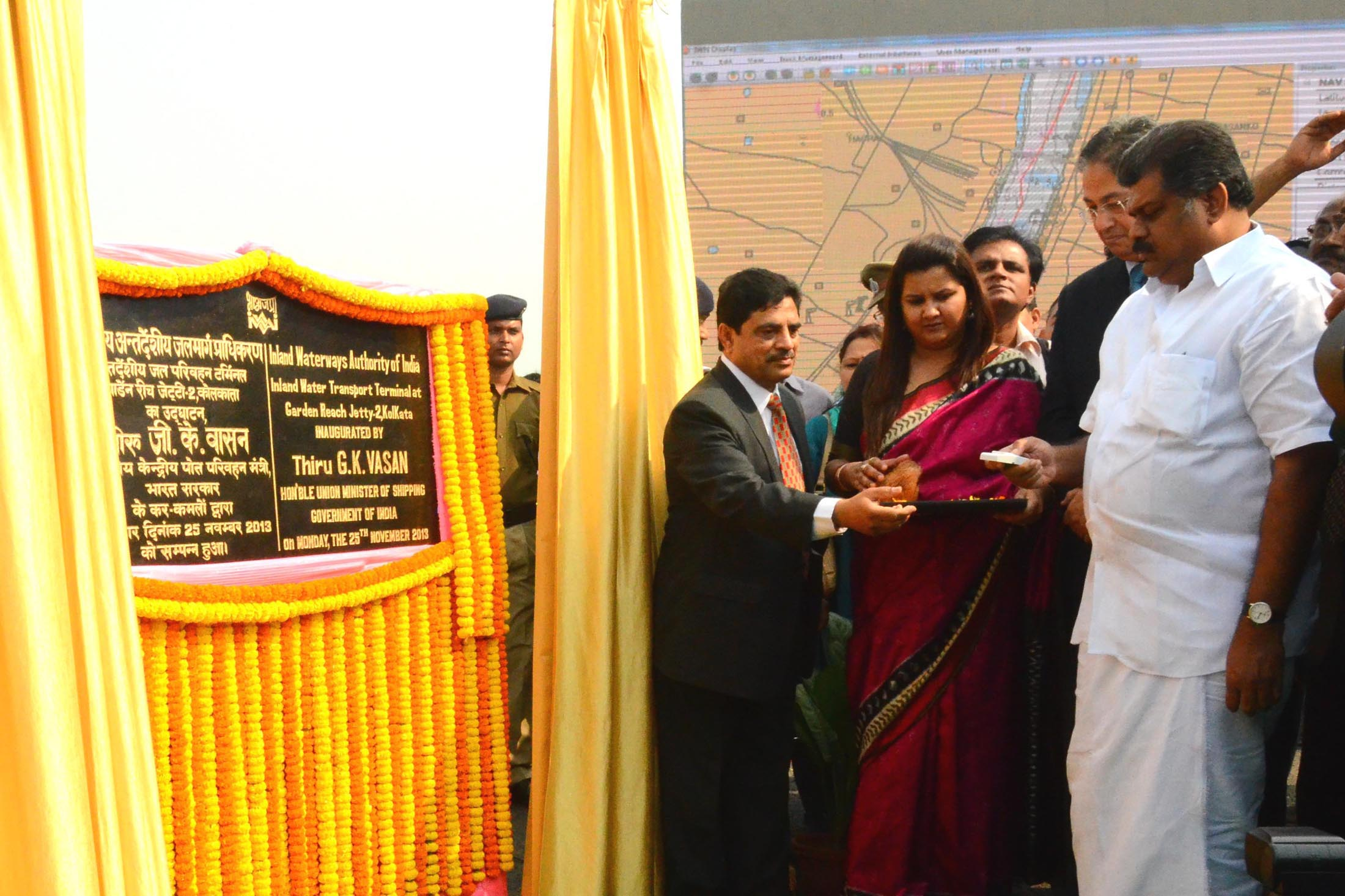
on 25 November 2013, former Union Minister for Shipping, Shri G.K. Vasan inaugurating the Transport terminal at Garden Reach Jetty-2.

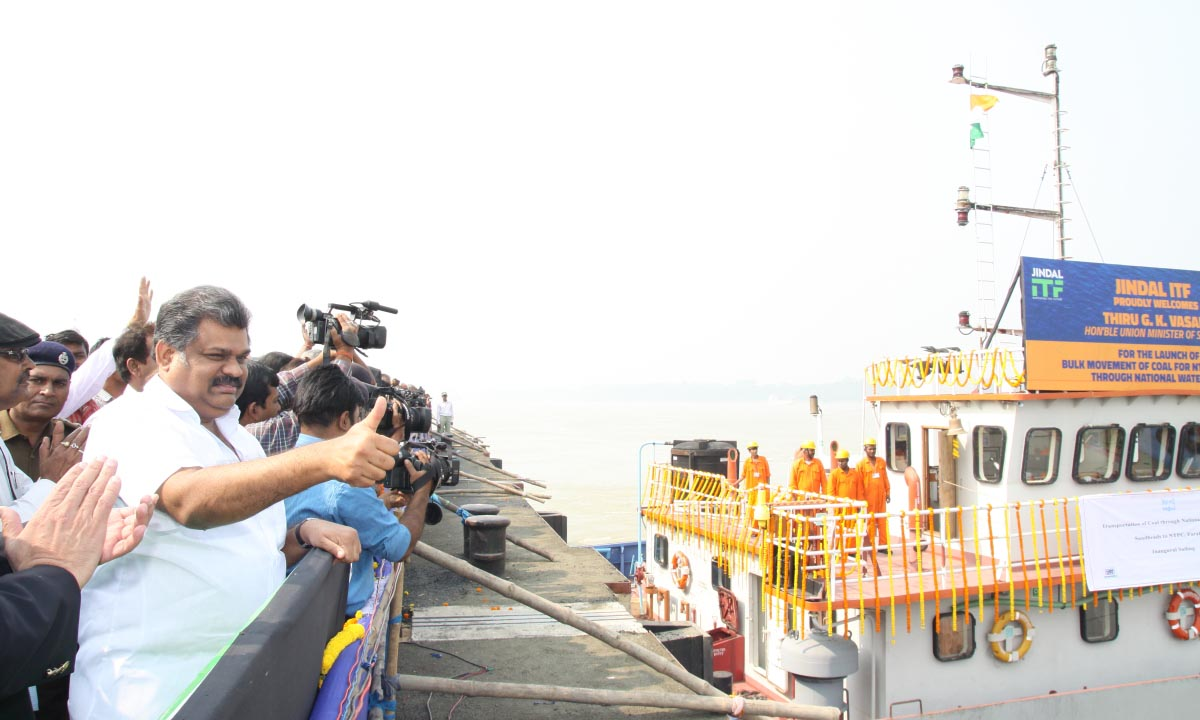
on 25 November 2013, former Union Minister for Shipping, Shri G.K. Vasan flagged off the jetties of the first bulk coal movement project through National Waterways in Kolkata.

Former Union Shipping Minister G. K. Vasan inaugurated Inland Waterways Authority of India's (IWAI) Garden Reach Jetty 2 of the Kolkata Inland Port at Garden Reach on 25 November 2013. On this day, the first barge anchored at the port, the coal barge of 2100 DWT (Deadweight tonnage) was flagged off by the Union Shipping Minister and started its journey to Farakka.

The Kolkata Inland Port or Kolkata terminal was handed over to Indian subsidiary "Summit Alliance Port East Gateway" of the Summit Alliance Port Limited (SAPL)–a Bangladesh based off-dock service provider and inland water container terminal operator–on 30 October 2018 by the Inland Waterways Authority of India (IWAI), and began commercial operations on 31 October 2018 under a 30-year concession.

== Infrastructure ==
=== Jetties ===
Kolkata Inland Port has three riverine jetties, namely BISN Jetty, Garden Reach Jetty 1 and 2. Jetties provide berthing facilities to barges or lighter vessels.

BISN Jetty and Garden Reach Jetty 1 are pontoon jetties, these two jetties designed for fly ash loading; There are also facilities to provide Ro-Ro services. There is infrastructure for loading fly ash into vessels through pipes by diesel compressors. The combined berthing length of the two jetties is 70 metres (230 ft).

Garden Reach Jetty 2 handles general cargoes, besides having container loading and unloading facilities. Dedicated truck parking space is available, used by cargo transport trucks at the jetty. The jetty is a permanent RCC jetty with a berthing length of 71.25 metres (233.8 ft).

=== Storage facilities ===
This inland port facility has warehouse areas and storage areas, which are located on the river bank behind the jetties. The Garden Reach Jetty 2 has a warehouse area (transit shed) of 1,187 square meters, and the port has 4,048 square meters of hard stand area and 13,890 square meters of open area for cargo storage.

== Bibliography ==
- Shajid, Md. Abdullah Osman (2023). Annual Report 2022-23 (PDF) (Report).
