= Port of San Nicolás de los Arroyos =

Port in Paraná River, Argentina

Coordinates: 33°21′18″S 60°10′15″W

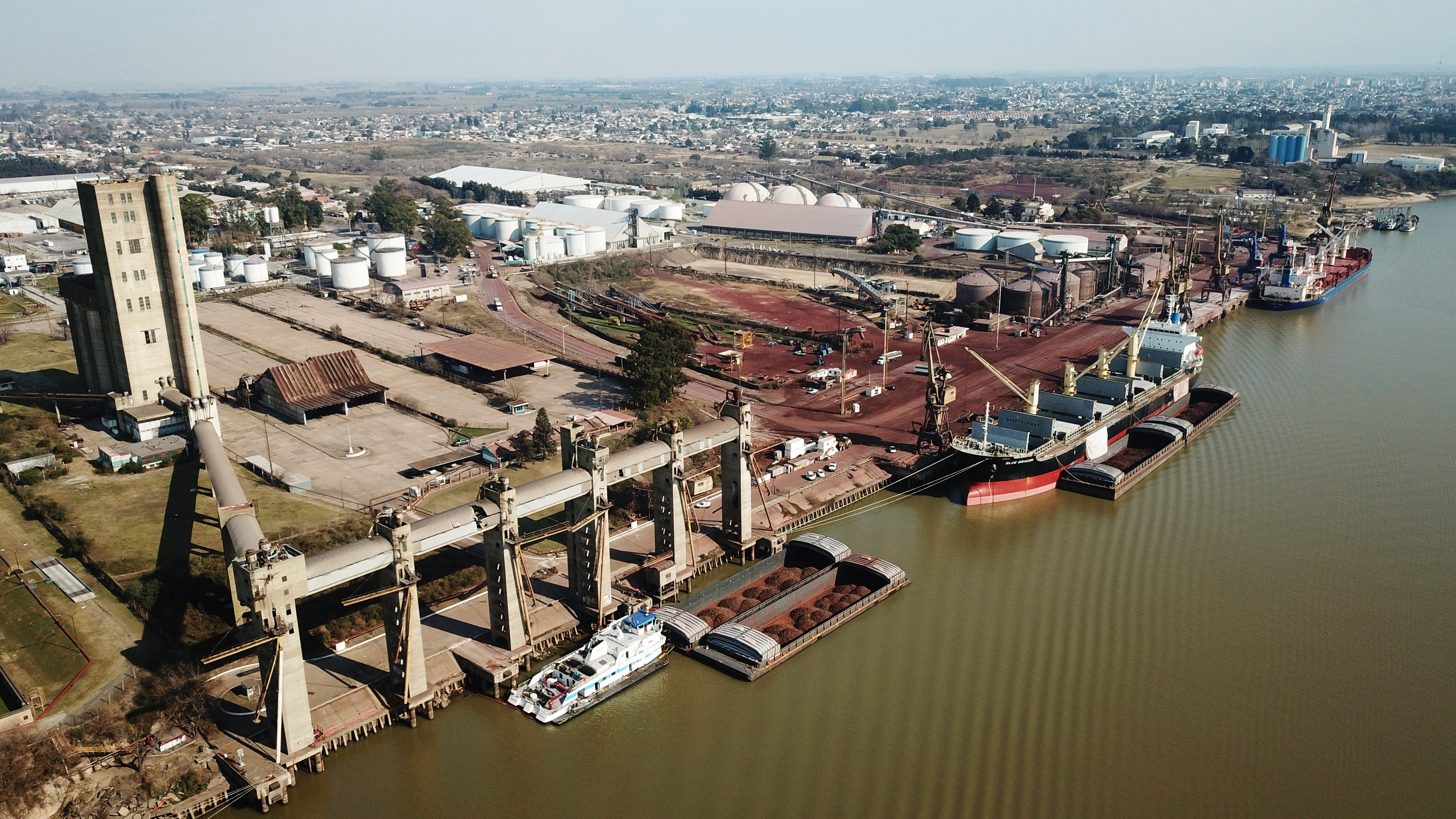

The Port of San Nicolás de los Arroyos is a port on the western shore of the lower course of the Paraná River (343 km) in Argentina, located in the jurisdiction of the city of San Nicolás de los Arroyos, Buenos Aires Province. It has a depth of 34 feet, and is capable of serving large vessels coming upstream from the Atlantic Ocean through the Río de la Plata.

The port is accessible by way of National Route 188. Its main exports are cereal (grain and subproducts) and steel. It is managed by the Buenos Aires Province Port Authority, a member of the Argentine Port Council.

== See also ==
- List of ports in Argentina
- Foreign trade of Argentina
