= San Lorenzo-Puerto General San Martín Port Complex =

Series of ports in Argentina

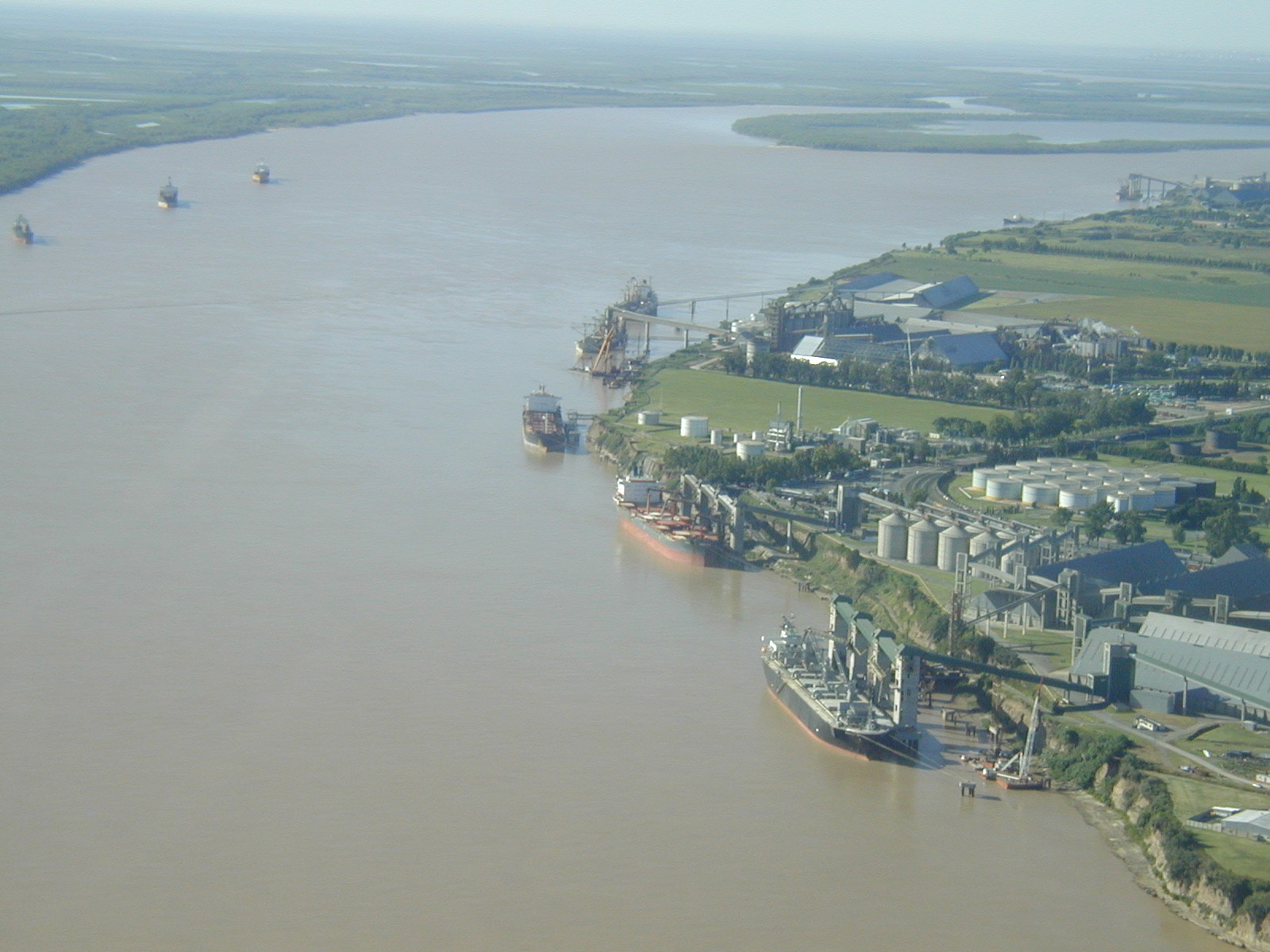
Aerial view of San Lorenzo North terminals

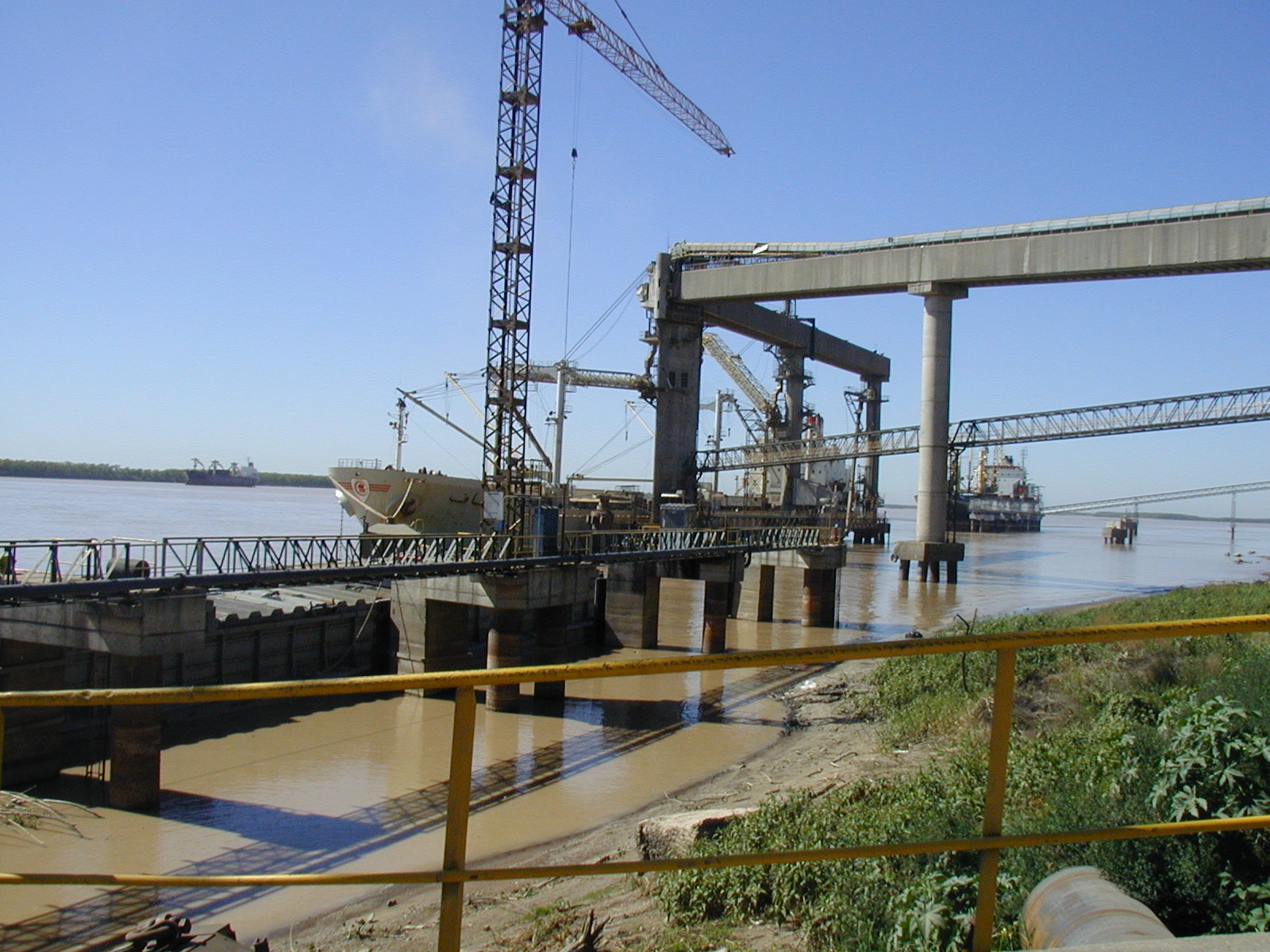
Quebracho terminal in San Lorenzo

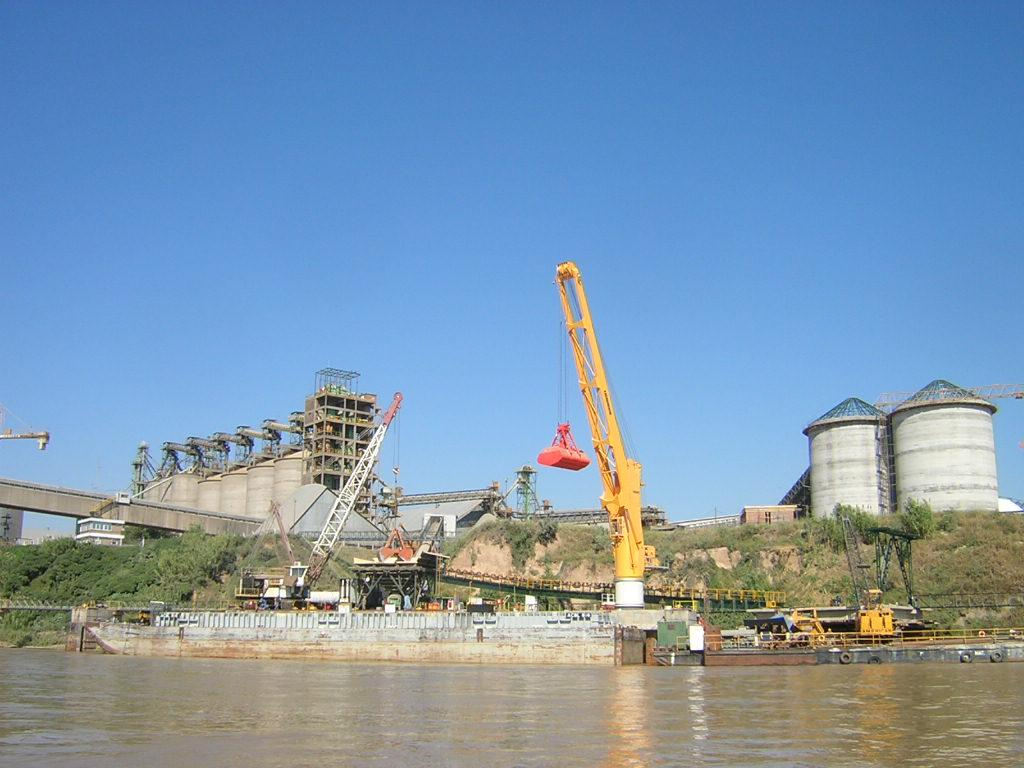
Other view of quebracho terminal in San Lorenzo

The San Lorenzo-Puerto General San Martín Port Complex is a series of port facilities on the western shore of the lower course of the Paraná River in Argentina, which are shared by the cities of San Lorenzo and Puerto General San Martín, province of Santa Fe.

This complex receives traffic coming from the Atlantic Ocean through the Río de la Plata. The port of Puerto General San Martín, located at 32°43′S 60°44′W, about 35 km upstream from the port of Rosario, is the last deepwater port on the Paraná, and is capable of hosting ships up to Panamax size. The depth of the river is kept at 34 feet by dredging.

San Lorenzo-Puerto General San Martín form a major commercial terminal for agricultural exports. Traffic at the complex accounts for 50% of the Argentine exports of soybean products. In 2004, the complex managed 7.4 million tonnes of cereals (36% of the country's total exports of corn, wheat and sorghum).

Reportedly, the port is also used by Colombian drug-trafficking organizations, to ship drugs to places in Europe and other places abroad.

== See also ==
- List of ports in Argentina
- Foreign trade of Argentina
