= Port of Chongqing =

Port of the Chongqing municipality

Coordinates: 29°34′06″N 106°35′11″E

Port of Chongqing 重庆港
- Interactive map of Port of Chongqing 重庆港

Location
- Country: People's Republic of China
- Location: Chongqing, Chongqing Municipality

Details
- Opened: 1992
- Operated by: Chongqing Port Services and Logistics Co., Ltd.
- Owned by: People's Republic of China
- Type of Harbor: Inland River Port
- No. of berths: 181

Statistics
- Annual cargo tonnage: 125 million tons (2012)
- Website; Port of Chongqing website

The Port of Chongqing is the port of the Chongqing municipality, laid out along the shores of the Yangtze, Jialing and Wujiang rivers. It is the deepest inland class I port (open to direct foreign trade) in China.

Chongqing Port has 181 production berths of all kinds, including 4 main multimodal transfer stations. The Yangtze river channel is 6 m deep during the wet season and allows navigation of ships up to 5,000DWT, the furthest upriver ships that large can travel. It had a total cargo throughput of 124 million tonnes in 2012. Chongqing is the main berth for sightseeing boats due for the Three Gorges.

== Layout and facilities ==
The Port of Chongqing is spread throughout Chongqing Municipality, and it is divided into 8 port areas, each in turn divided into several operation areas: the main three hubs of Main City, Wanzhou and Fuling, and five ancillary areas.

- The Main City Port Area (主城港区):
  - Mao'ertuo Operations Area (猫儿沱作业区)
  - Jiulongpo Operations Area (九龙坡作业区): It is being taken offline to re-purpose its land for development.
  - Tongguanyi Operations Area (铜罐驿作业区):
  - Guoyuan Operations Area (果园作业区): The recently opened wharf is the larger intermodal terminal in China.
  - Shawan Operations Area (沙湾作业区):
  - Fo'eryan Operations Area (佛耳岩区):
  - Cuntan Operations Area (寸滩作业区): The Cuntan Free Trade Area is the first inland bonded logistics zone in China. The river port has 7 unloading docks with a throughput capacity of 1.4 million TEU per year, or 1.4 million 20-foot containers per year.
  - Jingkou Operations Area (井口作业区):
  - Lijiatuo Operations Area (李家沱作业区):
  - Youniuxi Operations Area (优牛溪作业区):
  - Xingang Operations Area (新港作业 ):
  - Tushui Operations Area (土水作业区):
  - Caijia Operations Area (蔡家作业区):
  - Huangqian Operations Area (黄磏作业区): 68 ha of area, 850 m of coastline, berth 328m.
  - Chaoyanghe Operations Area (潮阳河作业区):
  - Chayuan Operations Area (茶园作业區):
  - Guojiatuo Operations Area (郭家沱作业区):
  - Jiguanshi Operations Area (鸡冠石作业区):
  - Maobeituo Operations Area (毛背沱作业区):
- Fuling Port Area (涪陵港区):
- Wanzhou Port Area (万州港区):13 cargo operations areas, 7 passenger operation areas.
  - Hongxigou Operations Area (红溪沟作业区): On the Three Gorges Reservoir. Specialized intermodal river-rail exchange. 4Mt and 50,000TEU annual capacity. 3 berths of 3,000DWT, 3 berths of 1,000DWT. Second phase: 15ha total area, 5ha of warehouses. Under construction 2,000DWT general cargo berth, 3,000DWT coal berth, 2,000DWT Ro-ro berth, 2 container berths.
  - Qingcaobei Operations Area (青草背作业区)
  - Honghuadi Operations Area (红花地作业区)
- Yongchuan Port Area (永川港区):
- Jiangjin Port Area(江津港区):
- Hechuan Port Area(合川港区):
- Fengjie Port Area(奉节港区):
- Wulong Port Area(武隆港区):

== Administration ==
The Port of Chongqing is run by the Chongqing Port Services and Logistics Group Ltd. Co. (重庆港务物流集团有限公司), formed in 2006 by the merger of the Chongqing Port Service Group, the Chongqing Supplies Group, the Wanzhou Harbor Group and Fuling Port Authority. One of its subsidiaries (and main port operator), Chongqing Gangjiu (重庆港九), is listed in the Shanghai Stock Exchange (SSE: 600279)

== Operations ==
Chongqing focuses on its intermodal capacity as a transshipment center, and as an inland link to the large oceanic ports downriver. It even defines itself as a "wet dry port".
