= Port of Lappeenranta =

Port in Lappeenranta, Finland

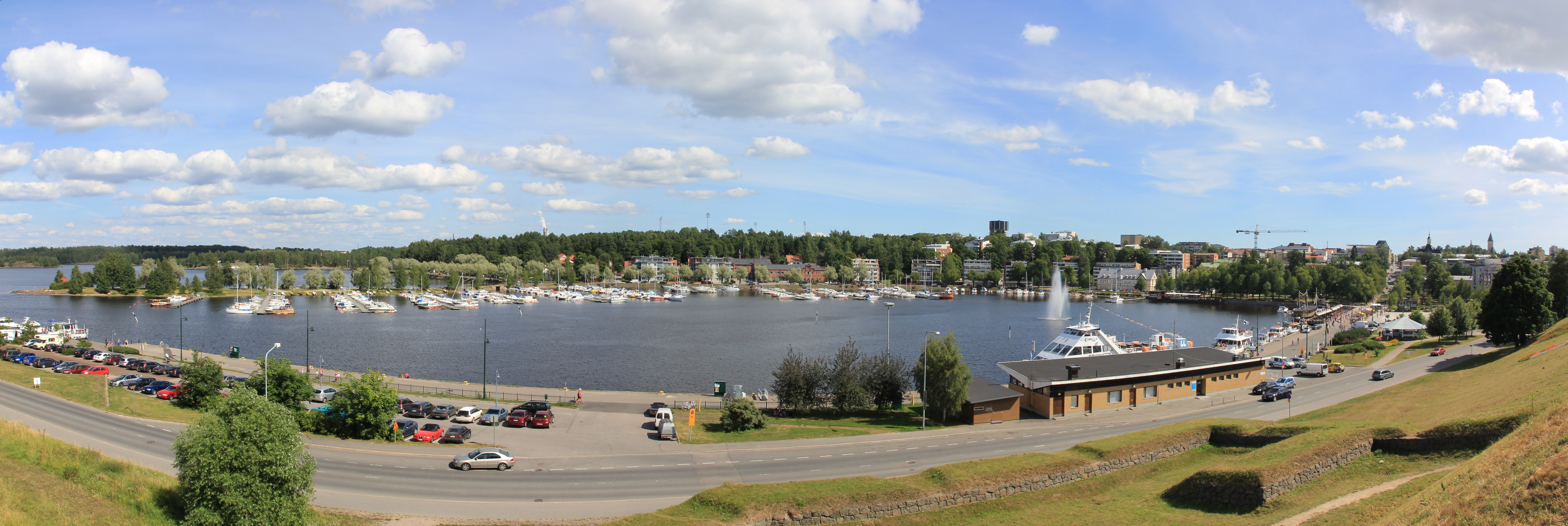
- Harbour in the foreground, with marina at the back
- Click on the map for a fullscreen view
- Port of Lappeenranta (Finland)
- Native name: Lappeenrannan satama

Location
- Country: Finland
- Location: Lappeenranta
- Coordinates: 61.062889°N 28.188306°E
- UN/LOCODE: FI LPP

Details
- Operated by: Port of Lappeenranta / Lappeenranta Free Zone Ltd
- Type of harbour: inland natural
- Draft depth: max. 4.0 metres (13.1 ft) depth

Statistics
- Passenger traffic: c. 16,400 (int'l, total) (2018)
- Website www.portoflappeenranta.fi/In-English

The Port of Lappeenranta (Finnish: Lappeenrannan satama, Swedish: Villmanstrands hamn) is an inland harbour in the city of Lappeenranta, Finland, on the southern shore of Lake Saimaa. It is located in the city centre on the Kaupunginlahti bay, and is therefore also known as the Kaupunginlahti harbour.

Scheduled international passenger services run from Lappeenranta to the Russian city of Vyborg (Finnish: Viipuri) on the Gulf of Finland, and wider afield, via the Saimaa Canal, which starts some 6.5 kilometres (4.0 mi; 3.5 nmi) east of the harbour. The total number of international passengers (departures and arrivals) was c. 16,400 in 2018.

There are many operators providing day cruises and water transport services to different parts of Lake Saimaa and connected waterways.

The Kaupunginlahti harbour also used to handle cargo traffic until 1968, when a new facility was built in Mustola, near the northern end of the Saimaa Canal. The Mustola harbour forms part of the overall Port of Lappeenranta.

== See also ==
- Port of Kuopio
