= Foreign trade of Argentina =

Argentine foreign trade processes

Exports of Argentina by product category (2019) Chemical products Transportation Machines Mineral products Plastics and rubbers Metals Foodstuffs Precious metals Textiles Instruments Animal products Vegetable products Paper goods Footwear and headwear Miscellaneous Stone and glass Wood products Animal and vegetable bi-products Animal hides Arts and antiques Weapons

Foreign trade of Argentina includes economic activities both within and outside Argentina especially with regard to merchandise exports and imports, as well as trade in services.

== Colonial and early history ==
Argentina's primary exports in colonial times were largely limited to salted beef due to the fact that beef would not stay fresh during trans-Atlantic shipping - a problem which similarly precluded most grain exports until the 1870s.

== Modern history ==
Argentina developed an agro-export model where they were highly dependent on the external sector, exporting commodities mostly to Western Europe. Much as colonial elites tried to emulate European styles, a wave of European investment and immigration so reshaped local culture and architecture in the late 19th and early 20th centuries (primarily in the Pampas area), that visitors often compared Buenos Aires with Paris.

Agriculturally focused and thinly populated, Argentina recorded trade surpluses for most of the period between 1900 and 1948, including a cumulative US$1 billion during World War I and US$1.7 billion during World War II. But record taxes on grain exports imposed by the administration of President Juan Perón (1946-55) and an increasing need for costly fuel and machinery helped result in a nearly-unbroken string of trade deficits between 1949 and 1962.

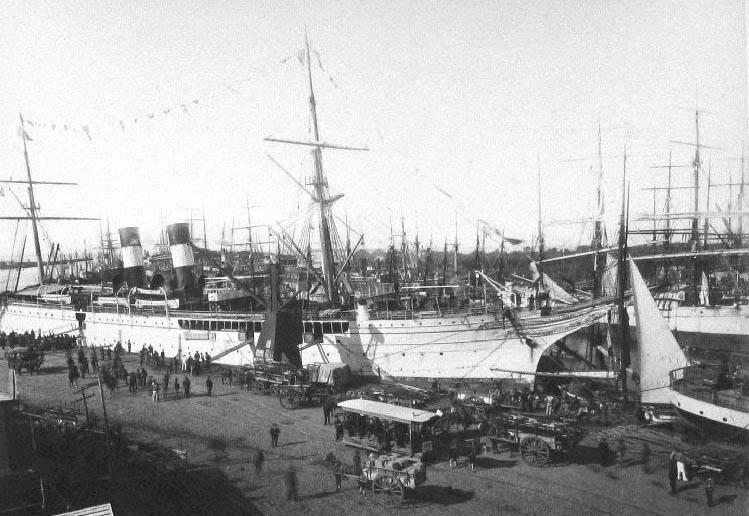
Port call on Buenos Aires' southside wharf (La Boca), circa 1888. Financed mostly with British capital, massive dock works touched off a foreign trade boom that reshaped the previously isolated Argentine economy.

Perón and, most notably, President Arturo Frondizi (1958-62), encouraged foreign as well as local investment in energy and industry as part of a developmentalist policy of import substitution industrialization. Trade deficits in the 1950s initially limited development due to the need for expensive machinery and supplies and a shortage of foreign exchange. But drawn to an economy that provided Latin America's highest standard of living, domestic and foreign investors responded, industrial production more than doubled, and the country's trade position became modestly positive throughout the 1963–79 era, even as domestic demand grew.

Policies of "free trade" financial deregulation pursued by Argentina's last dictatorship led to a sudden, record deficit in 1980 and, by 1981, a mountain of bad debts and financial collapse. The climate of slack domestic demand that prevailed in Argentina throughout the 1980s resulted in a cumulative US$38 billion in surpluses from 1982 to 1991; this brought the economy little direct benefit, however, as much of this was deposited abroad during that era of interest payment burdens and financial instability.

Economy Minister Domingo Cavallo enacted the Convertibility Law of 1991, pegging the monetary value of the Argentine peso to the United States dollar. The fixed exchange rate (1 peso to the dollar) allowed for a macroeconomic stabilization. Taking advantage of this low exchange rate, on the lower tariffs on imports and on the reappearance of credit after the free trade liberalization measures taken by President Carlos Menem's administration, Argentine firms and consumers tripled capital goods purchases from 1990 to 1994, while depressed auto sales rose by fivefold. The influx of imported machines and supplies helped the modernization of the country's industrial base; but it negatively impacted its trade balance, which accumulated US$22 billion in deficits from 1992 to 1999; the current account deficit, which would include growing foreign debt interest payments and deficits in trade in services, reached a record deficit of US$14 billion in 1998 alone.

Relying on sizable foreign investment inflows to balance the current account, these did not suffice and the Central Bank was again forced to resort to borrowing to protect the peso's value against such pressure (mostly by floating bonds, then the most sought after in the developing world). Recession helped lead to a US$1 billion surplus in 2000 and another US$6 billion in 2001; but it was too little, too late. Buffeted by generalized global instability and mounting capital flight, international markets massively shorted Argentine bonds in the second half of 2001 and on December 23, following a spate of unpopular crisis measures, the Argentine government declared a default on US$85 billion of its bonds - the largest sovereign debt default in history.

=== Crisis and recovery ===
Immediately after the collapse of the Argentine economy at the end of 2001 and the devaluation of the peso in 2002, imports fell over half and Argentina's trade surplus soared to over US$16 billion, providing for the first current account surplus since 1990. As recovery ensued and the exchange rate stabilized around 3 pesos/dollar, exports (mainly soy, cereals and other agricultural products, as well as machinery and fuels) grew steadily.

Imports began recovering sharply in 2003, as both the purchasing power of the peso and domestic demand increased, and, despite this, from 2003 to 2011 the nation's merchandise trade balance recorded a cumulative US$115 billion in surpluses. These surpluses were bolstered as much by growing exports as by a marked recovery in terms of trade for Argentina, which by 2010 had improved 40% over the level prevailing in the 1990s. The nation's perennial trade deficit in manufactures widened during this expansion, however, and exceeded US$30 billion in 2011. Accordingly, the system of non-automatic import licensing was extended in 2011, and regulations were enacted for the auto sector establishing a model by which a company's future imports would be determined by their exports (though not necessarily in the same rubric). Domestic production grew to supply the majority of the Argentine market in a number of important rubrics historically dominated by imports amid these changes, including diverse manufactures such as information technology, major appliances, footwear, and farm machinery.

A collapse in global commodity prices in 2014 led to trade deficits for most of the 2015-18 period, culminating in a record current account deficit in 2017 of US$31 billion and an ensuing foreign debt crisis. The 2018 crisis, however, pushed imports down by 37% from 2017 to 2020, yielding US$50 billion in cumulative trade surpluses from 2019 to 2022 despite a 92% recovery in imports from 2020 to 2022 - though practically nil in total current account surpluses, due to higher foreign debt interest outlays.

Trade in services has historically been in deficit for Argentina, as both travel and foreign debt interest outlays often far outstrip services income. Annual services deficits averaged around US$5 billion in the 1980s and 1990s (mainly due to foreign debt payments) - but after the 2001 crisis, fell to around US$1 billion annually until 2007. Services deficits rose steadily afterward to a record US$9.7 billion in 2017, then easing to US$3.6 billion by 2021 - but jumping to around US$7 billion in 2022, largely as a result of renewed outbound travel by Argentines.

=== Argentine foreign trade and current account balances ===
Argentine goods and services trade balances, and foreign debt, since 1970 (million US$):

Year	Goods exports	Goods imports	Balance	Services exports	Services imports	Interest	Current account balance	Foreign debt (Note: Includes private sector)
1970	1773	1694	79	424	437	223	-159	5171
1971	1740	1868	-128	457	459	256	-389	5564
1972	1941	1905	36	458	380	273	-223	6028
1973	3266	2235	1031	557	489	317	721	6429
1974	3931	3635	296	861	696	298	126	7628
1975	2961	3947	-985	743	571	460	-1284	7723
1976	3916	3033	883	836	564	465	667	9278
1977	5652	4162	1490	1117	730	370	1289	11445
1978	6400	3834	2566	1314	1414	405	1834	13276
1979	7810	6700	1110	1791	2553	493	-537	20950
1980	8021	10541	-2519	2744	3483	947	-4767	27157
1981	9143	9430	-287	2402	3107	2965	-4714	35657
1982	7625	5337	2288	1901	1858	4403	-2357	43634
1983	7836	4504	3332	1676	2017	4983	-2402	45069
1984	8107	4585	3523	1921	2125	5273	-2391	46171
1985	8396	3814	4582	1846	2077	4879	-953	49326
1986	6852	4724	2128	1865	2438	3934	-2858	51422
1987	6360	5818	542	2112	2397	3927	-4237	58324
1988	9135	5322	3813	2210	2465	4467	-1762	58303
1989	9579	4203	5376	2381	2646	5759	-1308	65511
1990	12353	4077	8276	2599	2978	5724	1764	62974
1991	11978	8275	3703	2736	3743	4828	-2735	65229
1992	12235	14872	-2637	2737	3855	3679	-8361	62972
1993	13118	16784	-3665	3127	4273	3608	-8153	72425
1994	15839	21590	-5751	3364	7143	4774	-10981	87524
1995	20963	20122	841	3826	7262	6375	-5104	101462
1996	23811	23762	49	4405	7952	7353	-6755	114423
1997	26431	30450	-4019	4599	8984	8826	-12116	129964
1998	26434	31377	-4944	4854	9298	10347	-14465	147634
1999	23309	25508	-2200	4719	8830	11329	-11910	152563
2000	26341	25280	1061	4936	9219	12352	-8955	155015
2001	26543	20320	6223	4627	8490	12162	-3780	166272
2002	25651	8990	16661	3495	4956	10414	8702	156813
2003	29939	13851	16088	4500	5693	9999	8073	164778
2004	34576	22445	12130	5288	6619	9909	3076	171473
2005	40387	28687	11700	6634	7626	6816	5055	114255
2006	46546	34154	12393	7911	8674	5322	6499	109504
2007	55980	44707	11273	10046	11027	5856	6049	125366
2008	70019	57462	12556	11424	13646	5722	5421	125859
2009	55672	38786	16886	10545	12537	4527	7254	119267
2010	68174	56793	11382	12817	14621	4820	-1623	134011
2011	82981	73961	9020	14497	17649	4960	-5340	145154
2012	79982	67974	12008	14247	18344	5077	-2138	145722
2013	75963	74442	1521	13680	19009	5058	-13124	141491
2014	68404	65736	2668	13396	18038	5431	-9179	144801
2015	56784	60203	-3419	13214	19029	5107	-17622	152632
2016	57909	55852	2057	13425	21876	7443	-15105	181432
2017	58645	66938	-8293	15506	25202	10904	-31151	234549
2018	61782	65483	-3701	15342	24277	16157	-27084	277827
2019	65115	49125	15990	14802	19646	17360	-3492	278489
2020	54884	42356	12528	9492	12028	6055	2688	270694
2021	77934	63184	14751	9499	13101	7135	6645	267004
2022	88446	81523	6923	14487	21396	8174	-3964	276473
2023	66789	73714	-6925	16532	22572	10773	-20751	283964
2024	79721	60822	18899	17167	22917	11568	5701	277257

== Commercial relationships ==
=== Mercosur ===
Mercosur—the customs union that includes Argentina, Brazil, Paraguay, and Uruguay—entered into force January 1, 1995; Bolivia, Chile, and Venezuela joined the pact subsequently as associate members. Cooperation between Brazil and Argentina (historic competitors) is the key to Mercosur's integration process, which includes political and military elements in addition to a customs union; Brazil accounts for 74% of Mercosur GDP and Argentina about 23%. Argentine intra-Mercosur trade rose dramatically from US$4 billion in 1991 to US$23 billion in 1998; it declined to US$9 billion during the 2002 crisis, but recovered quickly and reached US$44 billion in 2011 (28% of the Argentine total). More than 90% of intra-Mercosur trade is duty-free, while the group's common external tariff (CET) applies to more than 85% of imported goods. Remaining goods will be phased into the CET by 2006.

Brazil's higher level of industrialization and production capacity, as well as other economic asymmetries, have been a source of tension with Argentina. Following the 2001-02 crisis, Argentina's recovering industrial sector has pressured the government to obtain restrictions (especially quotas) on Mercosur's free trade regulations, in order to protect their growth from what they see as disloyal competition from their larger partner to the north. Exports to Brazil helped lessen the impact of the crisis on the industrial sector somewhat, though Argentina's intra-Mercosur trade yielded it a cumulative US$15 billion deficit from 2004 to 2008. A renewed devaluation of the peso contributed to a US$700 million surplus with Mercosur in 2009, though deficits of US$1.8 billion were recorded in 2010 and 2011.

Argentine trade with fellow Mercosur nations reached US$35 billion in 2022, and as in most years remained in deficit for Argentina with US$15.8 billion in exports and US$19.3 billion in imports. Mercosur buys 68% of Argentine exports of motor vehicles and auto parts, and these made up three-eights of total exports to the bloc in 2022.

=== China ===
Trade with China was negligible until 1992; it later grew rapidly and by 2010, China became Argentina's second largest trading partner. Argentine exports to the Asian giant are mainly soy, beef, barley and, increasingly, lithium carbonate - while imports are mainly industrial and consumer goods. Modest Argentine surpluses with China turned into deficits in 2008, however, and anti-dumping measures enacted subsequently triggered a Chinese boycott of its top Argentine import, soy oil, in 2010. Following trade negotiations, soy oil purchases from China resumed in 2011.

Argentina's merchandise trade deficit with China has mostly grown since then, reaching US$9.5 billion on US$17.5 billion in imports by 2022; China is now Argentina's leading source of imports by nation, with 21.5%.

These deficits have, in recent years, been partly financed by China itself by way of foreign exchange swaps. The two central banks first established these swap facilities in 2017, and expanded them to 130 billion yuan ($19.2 billion) in December 2018. In November 2022, Argentina and China agreed to add another 35 billion yuan (US$5.2 billion).

China has become the largest investor in Argentina's growing lithium mining sector, which by 2030 is projected by JPMorgan Chase to become the second-largest in the world - only behind Australia.

=== United States ===
The United States replaced the United Kingdom in the 1920s as both the leading source of manufactures and of imports overall. The U.S. share of imports and exports remained relatively stable at around 20% and 10%, respectively, until 2002; these proportions declined steadily afterward and by 2010, were approximately half the historical percentages. The U.S. has largely maintained a moderate trade surplus with Argentina, however. This surplus reached US$3.7 billion in 1998. The Argentine crisis led to modest bilateral deficits for the U.S. in 2002-05 - but U.S. surpluses returned in 2006, growing to a record US$6.6 billion by 2014 before stabilizing.

Petrochemicals, gold, silver, and aluminum are the leading Argentine exports to the U.S., and wine the leading Argentine consumer good in the U.S. market; Argentine imports are in turn mainly industrial. Fresh Argentine beef was exported to the U.S. market in 1997 for the first time in over 60 years, and in 1999 its export quota of 20,000 tons was filled. Beef exports to the U.S. were suspended in August 2000 when Argentine cattle near the border with Paraguay (whose authorities refuse to vaccinate cattle against highly contagious hoof and mouth disease) were discovered to have anti-bodies for the infection. The quota was reinstated in early 2002 and has since averaged 28,000 tons.

The Obama administration suspended Argentine participation in the Generalized System of Preferences (GSP) in 2012, citing a failure to pay arbitration payments awarded by the World Bank's ICSID to a number of U.S. firms adversely impacted by the 2002 devaluation of the peso. The GSP benefit (US$18 million in 2011) is relatively minimal, equaling 0.4% of Argentine exports to the U.S. of US$4.2 billion.

U.S.-Argentine trade has nevertheless grown - albeit slowly - and Argentina remains one of a few countries with which the U.S. routinely maintains a merchandise trade surplus. Mutual trade reached nearly US$20 billion in 2022, with US$6.9 billion in U.S. imports from Argentina and US$13 billion in exports to Argentina.

Trade in services with Argentina has been especially advantageous for the U.S., with Argentina's services deficit with the U.S. reaching US$5 billion in 2019 - the entirety for that year.

=== European Union ===
Argentina has a thriving and longstanding trade relationship with the European Union, as well as close historic and cultural ties dating to the colonial era that spanned 300 years until independence in 1816.

European investment and immigration dramatically reshaped Argentina after 1880 - and the British Empire in particular dominated Argentine trade with over a third of the total until World War I, buying mainly meats and cereals in exchange for a wide variety of consumer and industrial goods.

Argentine trade with Europe gradually declined in relation to other partner nations and regions. But the EU is still Argentina's third largest trading partner (after Brazil and China) and accounted for 13% of total Argentine trade in 2022, or US$22 billion - nearly balanced between exports to the EU (US$10.8 billion) and imports (US$11.1 billion). Argentina's main exports to the EU are processed agricultural products (38%), chemical products (21%) and fish and seafood (8%). The EU exports to Argentina mainly manufactured products, such as machinery and appliances (28%) and chemical products, including pharmaceutical products (29%).

Trade in services, which was relatively stable until 2019, was temporarily affected during the COVID pandemic - to later rebound. In 2020, the EU imported services from Argentina worth 1.6 billion euros, while it exported services worth 3.5 billion euros.

Argentina is also an important investment destination for European companies, particularly Spain. The stock of investments from the EU was 35.8 billion euros in 2020, making the EU, as a bloc, the top foreign investor in the country. Some 21 EU member states have signed agreements for the promotion and reciprocal protection of investments with Argentina, and as of 2022, the European Investment Bank had a portfolio of loans amounting to € 655 million in Argentina (including loans under preparation).

=== Intellectual property issues ===
Argentina adheres to most treaties and international agreements on intellectual property. It is a member of the World Intellectual Property Organization and signed the Uruguay Round agreements in December 1993, including measures related to intellectual property. However, extension of adequate patent protection to pharmaceuticals has been a highly contentious bilateral issue.

In May 1997, the U.S. suspended 50% of Argentina's GSP benefits because of its allegedly unsatisfactory pharmaceutical patent law. In May 1999, The U.S. Government initiated consultations under World Trade Organization procedures to address these inadequacies and expanded the consultations in May 2007.

== Merchandise exports and imports ==
=== Foreign trade by type of product ===
Argentine foreign trade in 2024 by type of product (million US$):

Product class	Exports	Imports	Balance
Meats, offal, and animals	3478	117	3369
Seafood	1969	42	1927
Dairy	1464	25	1439
Maize, wheat, and other cereals	10833	57	10776
Soybeans and other oilseeds	3183	3338	-155
Other crops	2169	843	1326
Vegetable oils	8057	116	7941
Fruit and vegetable preparations	1066	98	968
Wine and spirits	880	67	813
Animal fodder (mainly soy)	11435	85	11350
Tobacco	322	61	261
Other agricultural goods	1057	806	251
Fuel and lubricants	8203	3789	4414
Other minerals	644	841	-197
Pharmaceuticals	991	2487	-1496
Perfume and cosmetics	549	430	119
Fertilizers	36	1541	-1505
Cleansers, polish, etc.	160	424	-264
Other chemicals	2872	6224	-3352
Rubber and plastics	1128	3798	-2670
Leather, hides, and furs	431	152	279
Forestry products	627	1065	-438
Textiles, apparel, and footwear	391	1883	-1492
Glass, stone, ceramics, etc.	137	505	-368
Gold, silver, jewelry, and geodes	3341	86	3255
Iron and steel	1148	2152	-1004
Aluminum	1111	355	756
Other metals	61	1085	-1024
Machinery and parts	1369	15779	-14410
Motor vehicles and parts	8459	8959	-500
Aircraft and other transport equipment	52	206	-154
Precision equipment	111	1898	-1787
Other manufactures	1987	1508	479
(Argentina) Total	79721	60822	18899

Argentine exports by product category, since 1993 (million US$):

Category	1993-96	97-2000	2001-04	2005-08	2009-12	2013-16	2017-20	2021-24
Total Exports (annual)	18433	25629	29177	53233	71702	64765	60106	78332
Soy	2764	3639	6155	11872	16875	18338	16008	20579
Motor Vehicles & Parts	1300	2759	2144	5341	8850	7968	6477	8426
Oil, Gas, Petrochemicals	2236	3630	5753	8219	7272	4393	4245	8372
Corn	743	1155	1110	2147	3598	4240	5104	8137
Beef & Leather	1782	1654	1422	2493	2398	2099	3209	3823
Gold & Silver	20	90	115	495	1907	1994	2637	3162
Wheat	986	1380	1307	2159	2333	1372	2713	3106
Fruit & Wine	622	885	892	1865	2479	2342	2337	2030
Fish & Seafood	841	901	849	1119	1324	1567	1932	1905
Sunflower	947	1123	662	1036	1043	654	787	1526
Barley	128	174	141	361	1054	1210	842	1273
Dairy	189	328	348	712	1081	1080	824	1266
Others	5875	7911	8279	15414	21488	17508	12991	14727

=== Foreign trade by leading export destinations ===
Argentine foreign trade in 2024 by leading export destinations, and chief exports and imports with each (million US$):

Partner	Exports	Imports	Balance
Brazil	13608	14349	-741
United States	6453	6226	227
Chile	6323	727	5596
China	6053	11669	-5616
India	3933	1296	2637
Vietnam	3281	778	2503
Peru	2478	236	2242
Uruguay	1792	818	974
Switzerland	1696	570	1126
Netherlands	1691	380	1311
Saudi Arabia	1493	94	1399
Spain	1446	997	449
Paraguay	1437	3314	-1877
Malaysia	1378	230	1148
Indonesia	1337	315	1022
South Korea	1233	511	722
Canada	1115	384	731
Italy	1083	1333	-250
Algeria	1012	131	881
Colombia	835	318	517
Germany	810	2656	-1846
Mexico	792	1424	-632
Poland	759	190	569
Ecuador	688	345	343
Bangladesh	688	26	662
United Kingdom	663	497	166
Rest of the world	15644	11008	4636
(Argentina) Total	79721	60822	18899

=== Exports by province ===
Argentine exports in 2024 by province and category (million US$):

Province	Exports	Per capita	Growth from 2010	Raw materials	Agricultural manufactures	Industrial	Energy
Buenos Aires Province	29410	1674	28.6	5448	9439	11472	3051
Santa Fe	14730	4141	-0.8	1356	11716	1521	136
Córdoba	9976	2507	20.1	3984	4243	1727	23
Neuquén	3814	5246	1062.8	55	14	68	3676
Chubut	3511	5822	6.2	687	89	994	1741
Santa Cruz	2267	6787	40.2	316	55	1619	277
San Juan	1888	2308	-10.3	73	222	1594	0
Mendoza	1602	795	-5.5	218	1041	250	93
Entre Ríos	1424	998	-8.5	782	533	108	1
Santiago del Estero	1320	1252	183.9	1258	59	3	0
Salta	1281	889	26.5	835	90	318	38
Jujuy	1061	1329	182.9	465	169	426	0
La Pampa	1026	2803	257.5	777	211	5	33
Tucumán	954	560	4.3	219	359	373	3
San Luis	642	1187	19.1	288	213	141	0
Río Negro	601	789	21.7	302	110	5	184
Misiones	442	345	-16.3	52	250	140	0
Tierra del Fuego	413	2162	5.6	60	12	42	299
Chaco	402	352	7.8	327	70	5	0
Buenos Aires	364	117	-2.9	0	37	326	0
Catamarca	340	791	-79.8	32	25	283	0
Corrientes	258	215	66.5	122	103	33	0
La Rioja	219	569	-23.7	7	150	62	0
Formosa	37	61	2.8	32	5	0	0
Not classified by prov.	1740	n.a.	-51.6	599	452	539	150
(Argentina) Total	79721	1731	17.0	18295	29669	22052	9705
