= Port of Rosario =

Port in Argentina

Coordinates: 32°58′14″S 60°37′06″W

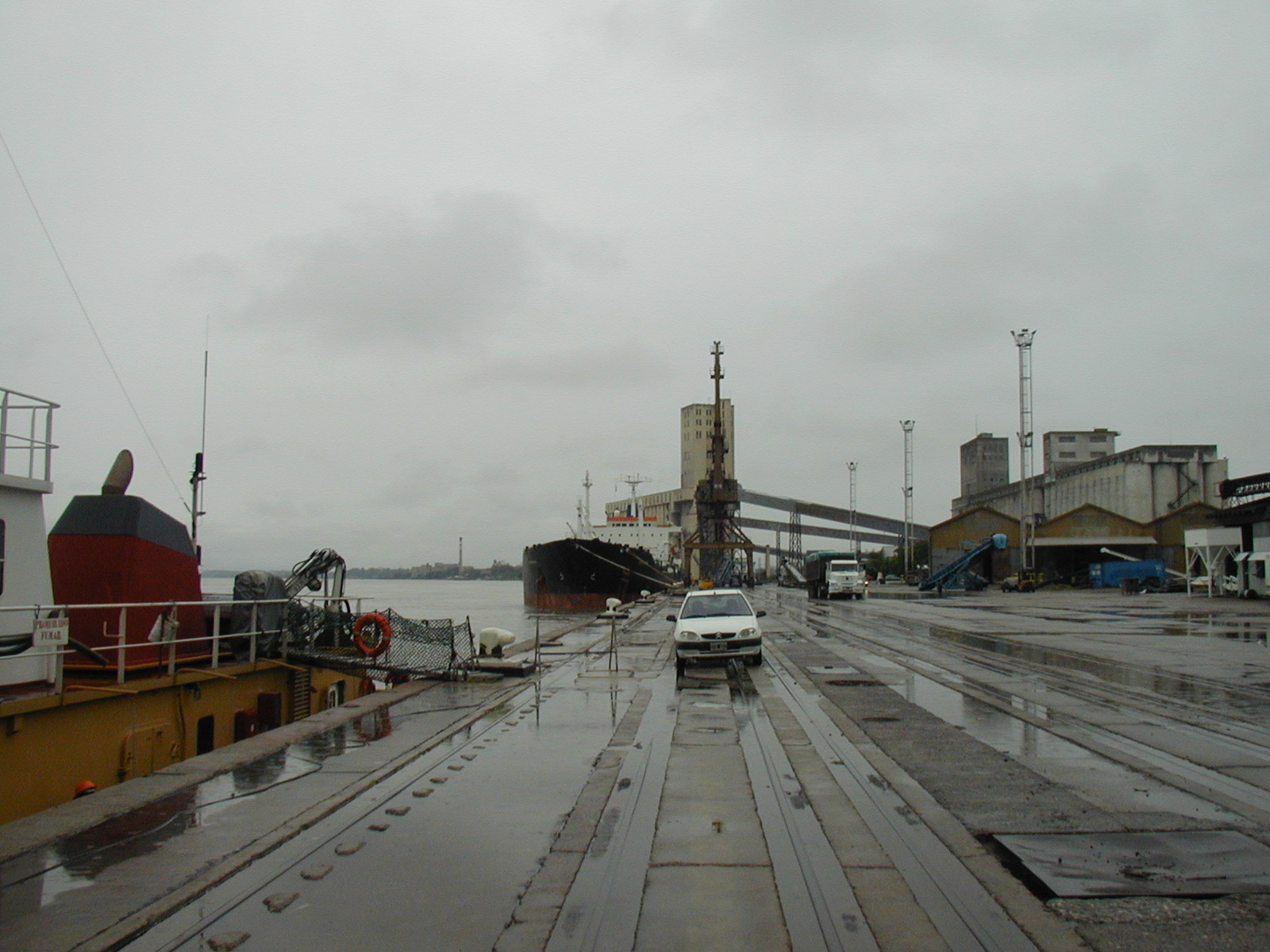
Cargo pier at the port

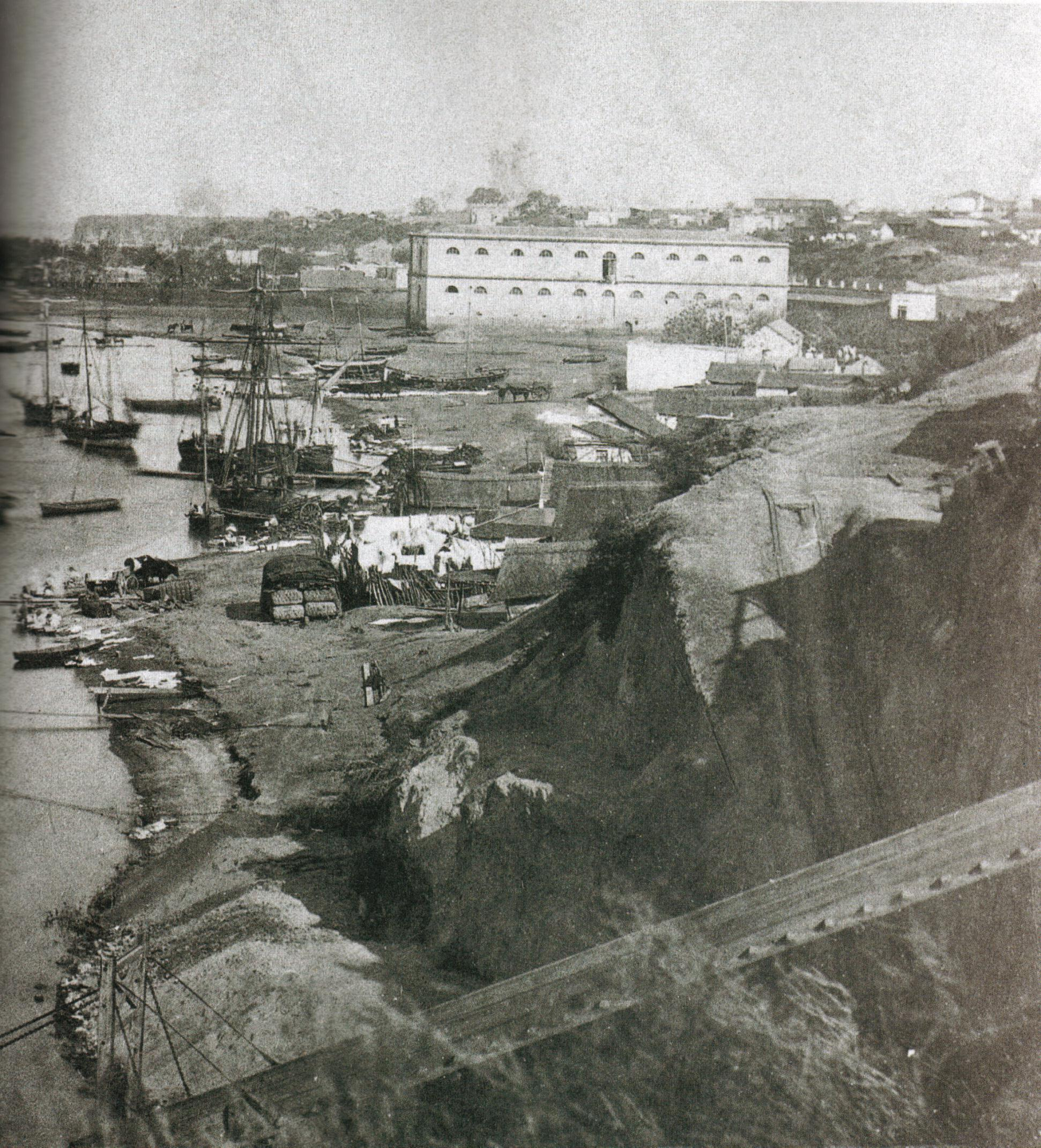
The Port of Rosario, c.1868

The Port of Rosario is an inland port and a major goods-shipping center of Argentina, located in the city of Rosario, province of Santa Fe, on the western shore of the Paraná River, about 550 km upstream from the Atlantic Ocean.

== Overview ==
The port is the largest of a series located in the several cities of the Greater Rosario that lie on the Paraná; the last (northernmost) able of overseas traffic being Puerto General San Martín (23 km upstream from Rosario). It is part of the Bi-Oceanic Corridor that joins the Atlantic with the Pacific Ocean via Buenos Aires, Rosario, Córdoba, the Cuyo region and Valparaíso, Chile; going north–south it forms the axis of the Paraguay-Paraná waterway. It directly services the area of Santa Fe that produces a large part of Argentine exports, and indirectly the whole Mercosur trade bloc. In 2003 the traffic in the port amounted to 2.9 million tonnes.

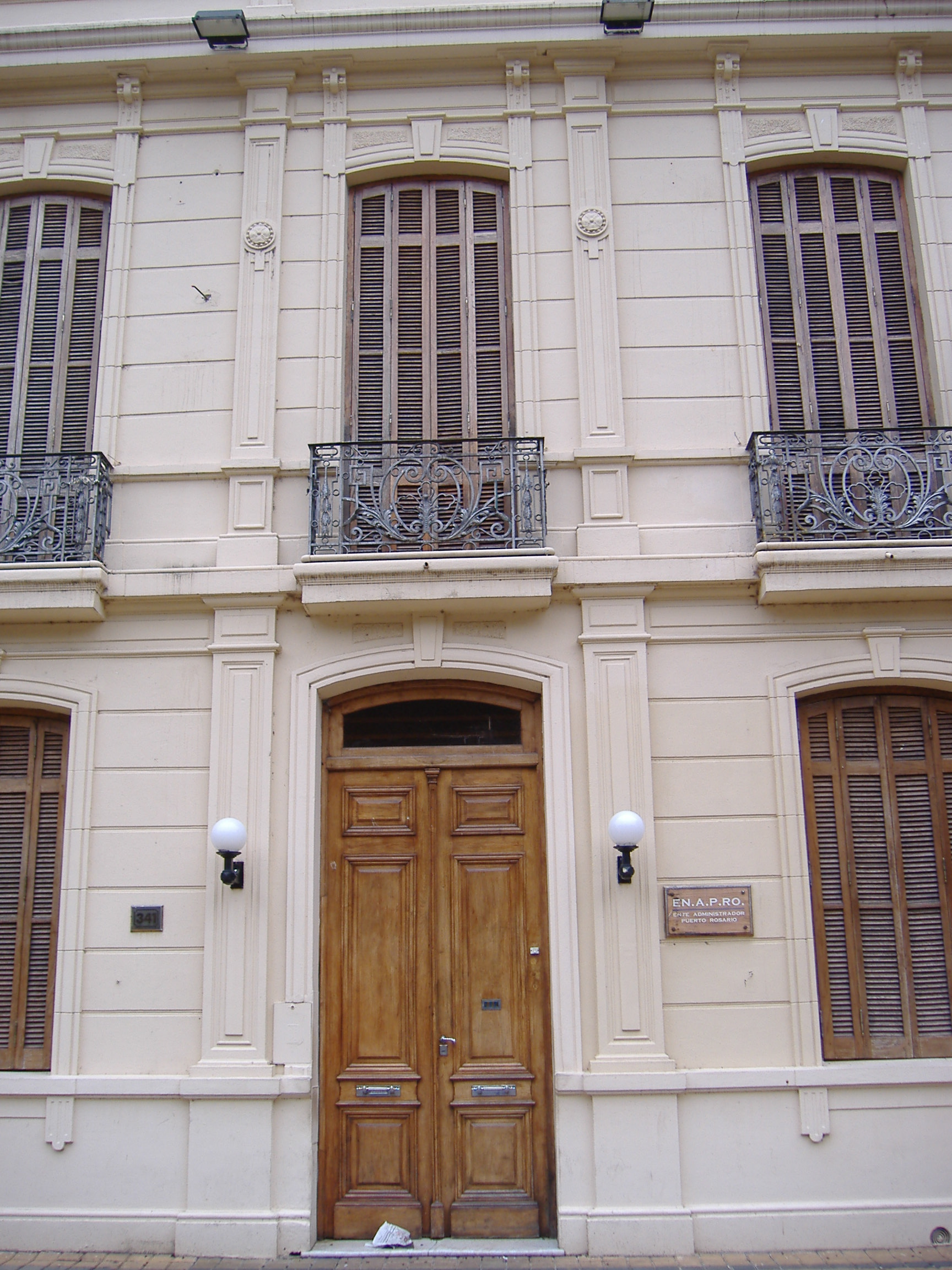
The office of the current port manager (ENAPRO)

At this point of the course of the Paraná (Kilometer 420) lies the depth transition between overseas and river navigation. The main channel of the river directly in front of the port has an advantageous configuration that allows to preserve a depth of 34 feet with minor periodic dredging. This allows for downstream navigation of vessels up to Panamax kind. The Paraná is about 600 m wide at Kilometer 418 and becomes 2,000 m wide downstream. Cargo from other parts of Argentina is brought into the port by the railway lines of the Nuevo Central Argentino, communicating with Córdoba (west) and Zárate, Buenos Aires Province (south), as well as the multiple national and provincial roads and highways that converge in Rosario. Communication with the north-eastern part of the country was enhanced by the 2003 opening of the Rosario-Victoria Bridge, that joins the city with the province of Entre Ríos. The Rosario International Airport (located 15 km east) has also been refurbished to work with cargo traffic.

The facilities were opened in 1852 partly as a hedge against the political and armed conflicts that ultimately led to the Federalization of Buenos Aires. The rapid development of Argentine agriculture after 1875 led to the port growth into a significant role in the nation's burgeoning grain exports sector, in subsequent decades. The Port of Rosario was nationalized in 1942 and by 1960, it had overtaken the Port of Buenos Aires as the nation's leading grain export hub.

== Administration ==
The Port of Rosario has, since 1994, been managed by ENAPRO (Ente Administrador del Puerto Rosario), a public company overseen by the provincial government, which grants concessions as appropriate to private companies. The first bid was won in 1998 by International Container Terminal Services (ICTSI), managers of the Port of Manila and of a terminal in the Port of Buenos Aires. ICTSI's Argentine subsidiary, Puerto Rosario S. A. (PROSA), faced labour conflicts and strikes after firing a number of port terminal workers it had promised to keep. It also failed to pay the royalties due to the ENAPRO and to perform the agreed investments. In 2000 the concession was revoked.

In 2002 a new company, Terminal Puerto Rosario S. A. (manager of the Port of Tarragona, Spain) was awarded the concession of Terminals 1 and 2 of the port for 30 years.

In October 2005 the National Secretariat of Ports and Navigable Ways ordered the beginning of works to dredge the Paraná to a depth of 34 feet, in the first stage, and later to 36 feet, downstream from Puerto General San Martín; this will allow for cargo vessels of up to 50,000 tonnes. The 34-feet stage (allowing for 46,600-tonne ships) was completed in August 2006.
