= Autonomous Port of Paris =

- Interactive map of Autonomous Port of Paris

Location
- Country: France
- Location: Paris
- Coordinates: 48.8566°N 2.3522°E

Statistics
- Website paris-ports.fr

The Autonomous Port of Paris (French: "Port autonome de Paris") is a public institution in France that was set up in 1970. Its mission is to develop waterway traffic and port activity by creating, maintaining and handling the commercial operation of 70 sites in Ile-de-France. It is the second largest inland port in Europe after Duisburg.
