= Puerto General San Martín =

- City
- Location of Puerto General San Martín in Argentina
- Coordinates: 32°43′S 60°44′W
- Country: Argentina
- Province: Santa Fe
- Department: San Lorenzo

Government
  - Intendant: Carlos de Grandis (PJ)

Area
  - Total: 47 km^{2} (18 sq mi)

Population (2010 census)
  - Total: 13,243
  - Density: 280/km^{2} (730/sq mi)
- Time zone: UTC−3 (ART)
- CPA base: S2202
- Dialing code: +54 3476

Puerto General San Martín is a small city in the province of Santa Fe, Argentina, located within the metropolitan area of Greater Rosario, about 35 km (22 mi) north from the center of the city of Rosario, on the western shore of the Paraná River. It has a population of 13,243 inhabitants according to the 2010 census [INDEC].

The city is located on a natural port of excellent quality, with an abrupt ravine and great depth (dredged up to 34 feet (10 m) in 2006, it is the last deepwater, Panamax-capable port on the Paraná). The city is home to an industrial complex and a major commercial terminal for agricultural exports (cereals, vegetable oils, etc.), managing 50% of the Argentine exports of soybean. The industrial and agricultural development, secondary to the swift recovery from the Argentine economic crisis of the late 1990s, is however an important source of pollution.

== History ==
The acknowledged founder of the town was Guillermo Kirk, a Scottish immigrant that came to Argentina in 1866 and became a farmer, working mainly in cereal crops. On 7 April 1879 Kirk bought a few portions of land on the shore of the Paraná River, for the purpose of laying down a village and devote the rest of the land to agriculture. In 1888 Kirk sent a letter to the provincial governor proposing this idea, calling the town Linda Vista ("Nice View") and attaching a plan. The government approved the necessary documents on 16 February 1889, deciding on the name Kirkton. In the end the town was not built in the proposed site, and Kirk returned to Scotland in 1898, after his Argentine wife died.

Puerto General San Martín officially became a city in 1987. The current name is an homage to General José de San Martín, leader of the Argentine War of Independence from Spain and Liberator of several other South American countries. The name is often shortened to Puerto San Martín or (by its residents) simply Puerto.
