= Gaetano Bavagnoli =

Italian conductor

Gaetano Bavagnoli (Parma, 1879 – Milan, June 5, 1933) was an Italian conductor who was particularly known for his work within the field of opera. He was mainly active within Italy's major opera houses during the first third of the 20th century; although he did conduct at important international stages like the Metropolitan Opera in New York City and the Royal Opera House in London as well. He also worked as a voice teacher and was notably the instructor of opera singers Emanuel Kopecky, Lina Pagliughi, and Aureliano Pertile.

== Early life and career: 1879–1911 ==
Born in Parma, Bavagnoli was the son of conductor and voice teacher Manlio Bavagnoli and it was from him that he received his early musical training. After graduating from the Parma Conservatory, Bavagnoli began working as a conductor in Italy in 1900. He also worked in Spain on the conducting staffs of the Teatro Real and the Liceu during the first decade of the 20th century. At the latter house he notably conducted performances of Vincenzo Bellini's La sonnambula with Amelita Galli-Curci as Amina.

On 10 August 1908 Bavagnoli conducted a performance of Giacomo Puccini's Manon Lescaut for the opening of the Teatro Municipal in San Nicolás de los Arroyos. In 1911 he joined the conducting staff of the Tetro Regio in Parma. While there he notably conducted that house's first presentation of Modest Mussorgsky's Boris Godunov on 25 December 1911 with Eugenio Giraldoni in the title role.

== Working in the United States: 1912–1916 ==
In 1912–1913 Bavagnoli conducted a touring production of Riccardo Zandonai's Conchita in the United States. The production starred Tarquinia Tarquini in the title role and made stops at the Cort Theatre in San Francisco (1912), the Philharmonic Auditorium in Hollywood (1912), the Heilig Theatre in Portland (1912), the Metropolitan Opera House in Philadelphia (1912), the Chicago Grand Opera (1913), and the Metropolitan Opera House in New York City (1913).

In 1913 Bavagnoli returned to Parma, this time working on the staff of the Teatro Massimo. In 1915 he was invited to join the conducting staff of the New York Metropolitan Opera after Arturo Toscanini decided not to renew his contract with the company. Bavagnoli accepted, making his Met debut on November 19, 1915, leading a performance of Giacomo Puccini's La bohème with Frances Alda as Mimì, Enrico Caruso as Rodolfo, Ida Cajatti as Musetta, and Antonio Scotti as Marcello. He remained at the Met for only one season, conducting a total of 61 performances of mostly Italian operas such as Aida, The Barber of Seville, Cavalleria Rusticana, Lucia di Lammermoor, Manon Lescaut, Tosca and La Traviata. He notably conducted the world premiere of Enrique Granados's Goyescas on January 28, 1916, with Anna Fitziu as Rosario and Giovanni Martinelli as Fernando. His last performance with the Met was conducting Friedrich von Flotow's Martha in an out of town engagement in Atlanta, Georgia on April 28, 1916, with Maria Barrientos in the title role.

== Later career: 1916–1933 ==
In the 1916–1917 season Bavagnoli worked on the conducting staffs at the Teatro Donizetti in Bergamo and the Teatro Regio in Parma. Over the next several years he remained busy conducting at various principal houses in Italy. In 1920 he conducted the Royal Opera, Covent Garden's first performances of Giacomo Puccini's Il tritico. He worked on the conducting staff of the Teatro Comunale di Bologna from 1920 to 1924, after which he was at the Teatro Regio di Torino from 1924 to 1926. From 1924 to 1931 he conducted the Winter Season at the Teatro Carlo Felice. In the 1926–1927 season he conducted at La Fenice.

Bavagnoli conducted at the Teatro dell'Opera di Roma in 1928–1929. In the late 1920s he worked as a conductor for Nellie Melba's Melba-Williamson Grand Opera Company in Australia. During the last few years of his life he was mainly busy working at the Teatro Comunale di Bologna and the Teatro Donizetti. At the latter house, he notably conducted an acclaimed performance of Vincenzo Bellini's Norma on September 28, 1931, in honor of the work's 100th anniversary, with Bianca Scacciati in the title role. In 1932 he led performances of Giacomo Meyerbeer's L'Africaine at the Arena di Verona Festival.

Bavagnoli died on June 5, 1933 in Milan at the age of 54.
