= The Female (1959 film) =

Film by Julien Duvivier

- Theatrical release poster
- French: La femme et le pantin
- Directed by: Julien Duvivier
- Adaptation by: Julien Duvivier; Marcel Achard; Albert Valentin; Jean Aurenche
- Dialogue by: Marcel Achard
- Based on: The Woman and the Puppet by Pierre Louÿs
- Produced by: Christine Gouze-Rénal
- Starring: Brigitte Bardot; António Vilar; Darío Moreno
- Cinematography: Roger Hubert
- Edited by: Jacqueline Sadoul
- Music by: Jean Wiener; José Rocca
- Production companies: Société Nouvelle Pathé Cinéma; Gray-Film; Dear Film Produzione; Progéfi
- Distributed by: Pathé Films (France); Dear Film (Italy)
- Release dates: 13 February 1959 (France); 4 March 1959 (Italy)
- Running time: 100 minutes
- Countries: France; Italy
- Language: French
- Box office: 2,453,892 admissions (France)

The Female (French: La femme et le pantin, lit. 'The Woman and the Puppet', Italian: Femmina), released in the United Kingdom and the Philippines as A Woman Like Satan, is a 1959 drama film directed by Julien Duvivier. It is the fourth film adaptation of the 1898 novel The Woman and the Puppet by Pierre Louÿs. The film stars Brigitte Bardot and António Vilar, with Darío Moreno.

== Premise ==
Mateo Diaz is a wealthy gentleman who loves and respects his wife but no longer finds her attractive because she is paralysed. He pursues Eva Marchand but she does not respond to his advances.

== Cast ==
- Brigitte Bardot as Éva Marchand
- António Vilar as Don Mateo Diaz
- Lila Kedrova as Manuela
- Daniel Ivernel as Berthier
- Darío Moreno as Arbadajian
- Jacques Mauclair as Stanislas Marchand
- Jess Hahn as Sidney

== Production ==
Brigitte Bardot wrote in her autobiography that although the crew would call director Julien Duvivier "Dudu", the set was not harmonious. She also described the difficulty of filming in the heat of Seville during the Seville Fair. Her fee was $87,500.

== Reception ==
Variety called it "old fashioned".

== See also ==
- The Woman and the Puppet (1920)
- The Woman and the Puppet (1929)
- The Devil Is a Woman (1935)
- That Obscure Object of Desire (1977)
