= List of operas by Riccardo Zandonai =

This is a complete list of operas by Riccardo Zandonai (1883–1944).

== List ==
Title	Subdivisions	Libretto	Première date	Place, theatre	Notes
La coppa del re	1 act	Gustavo Chiesa, after Friedrich Schiller	composed 1906 or before, never performed		
L'uccellino d'oro	3 acts	Father Giovanni Chelodi, after the Grimm brothers	spring 1907	Sacco di Rovereto	Unpublished. Zandonai's version is for piano and singers only. A performing edition was made by the conductor Silvio de Florian (1908–1995) in 1959.
Il grillo del focolare	3 acts	Cesare Hanau, after Charles Dickens' The Cricket on the Hearth	28 November 1908	Turin, Politeama Chiarella	
Conchita	4 acts	Maurice Vaucaire and Carlo Zangarini, after Pierre Louÿs' La Femme et le pantin	14 October 1911	Milan, Teatro Dal Verme	
Melenis	3 acts	Massimo Spiritini and Carlo Zangarini, after Louis Bouilhet	13 November 1912	Milan, Teatro Dal Verme	
Francesca da Rimini	4 acts	Tito Ricordi II, adapted from the play by Gabriele D'Annunzio	19 February 1914	Turin, Teatro Regio	
La via della finestra	3 acts	Giuseppe Adami, after Eugène Scribe	27 July 1919	Pesaro, Teatro Rossini	
Giulietta e Romeo	3 acts	Arturo Rossato and Matteo Bandello, after Luigi da Porto and N d'Atri	14 February 1922	Rome, Teatro Costanzi	There is a German version with libretto by Alfred Brüggemann (1873–1944).
I cavalieri di Ekebù	4 acts	Arturo Rossato, after Selma Lagerlöf's Gösta Berling's Saga	7 March 1925	Milan, La Scala	German version with libretto by Ernst Lert titled Die Kavaliere von Ekeby
Giuliano	prologue, 2 acts, epilogue	Arturo Rossato, after Jacobus de Voragine and Gustave Flaubert	4 February 1928	Naples, Teatro San Carlo	based on the legend of Saint Julian the Hospitaller
Una partita	1 act	Arturo Rossato, after Alexandre Dumas, père	19 January 1933	Milan, La Scala	
La farsa amorosa	3 acts	Arturo Rossato, after El sombrero de tres picos by Pedro de Alarcón	22 February 1933	Rome, Teatro dell'Opera	
Il bacio	3 acts	Arturo Rossato and Emidio Mucci, after Gottfried Keller	10 March 1954	RAI	final act left incomplete
