= Pasquinelli =

Pasquinelli is a surname. Notable people with the surname include:

- Fernando Pasquinelli, Argentine footballer
- Lala Pasquinelli, Argentine artist, poet, lawyer and activist
- Maria Pasquinelli (1913 – 2013), Italian teacher and member of the Fascist party
- Bruno and Tony Pasquinelli, founders of Pasquinelli Homes
