= Danilo Rinaldi =

Sammarinese footballer (born 1986)

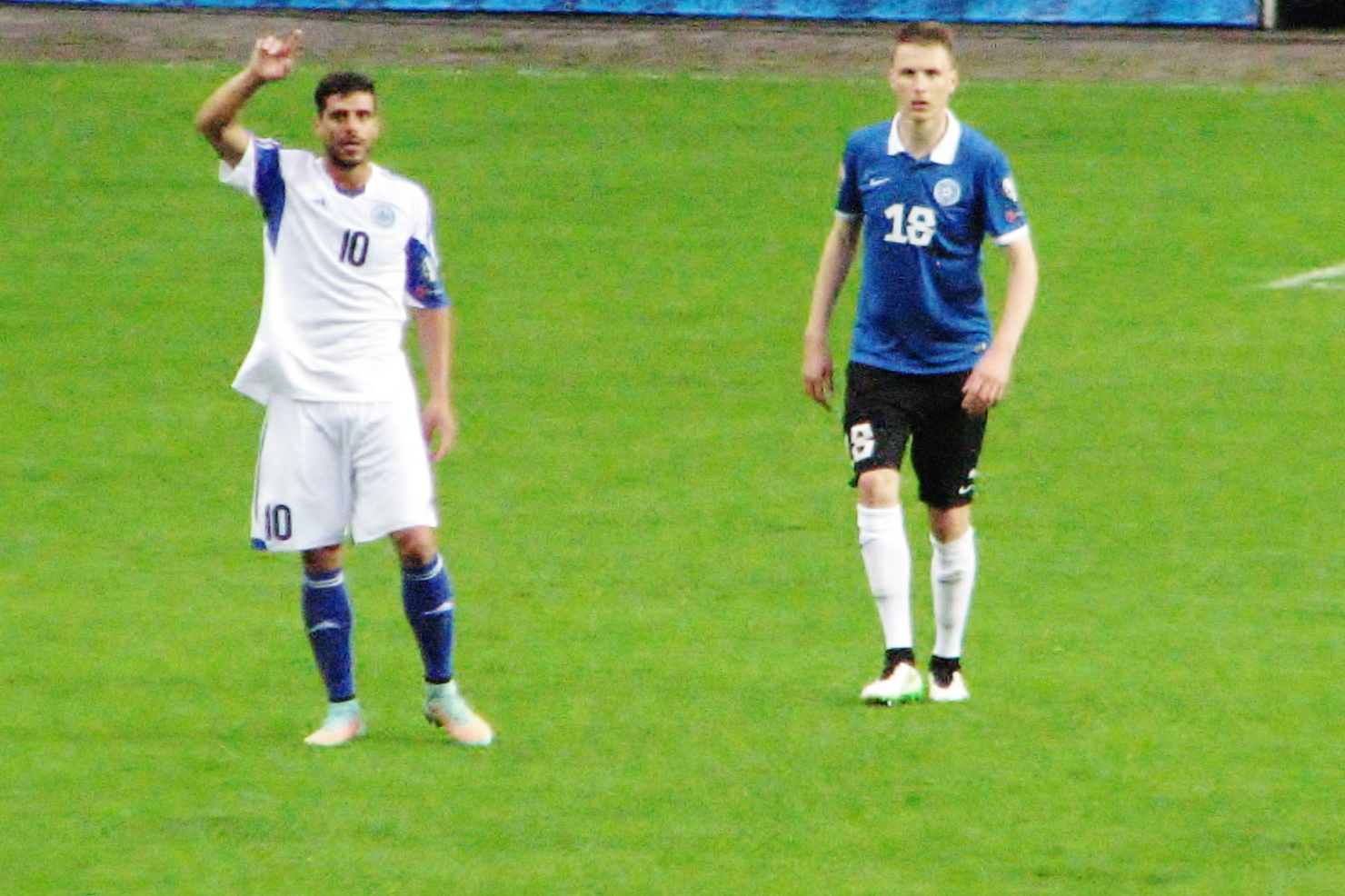
- Rinaldi (left) with San Marino in 2015

Personal information
- Full name: Danilo Ezequiel Rinaldi
- Date of birth: 18 April 1986 (age 40)
- Place of birth: Conesa, Argentina
- Position: Striker

Team information
- Current team: Cosmos
- Number: 16

Youth career
- 2000–2001: Chacarita Juniors
- 2001–2004: Conesa FC

Senior career*
Years	Team	Apps	(Gls)
2004–2005	Chacarita Juniors	0	(0)
2005	Conesa		
2005	Armenio		
2006	General Rojo		
2007–2008	La Emilia	23	(3)
2008–2010	Virtus	23	(13)
2010–2012	Conesa		
2012–2024	La Fiorita	160	(51)
2024–	SS Cosmos	47	(5)

International career^{‡}
2008–2023	San Marino	51	(1)
- * Club domestic league appearances and goals as of 5 June 2026 ‡ National team caps and goals as of 26 March 2023

Danilo Ezequiel Rinaldi (born 18 April 1986) is a footballer who plays as a striker for Campionato Sammarinese club Cosmos. Born in Argentina, he plays for the San Marino national team.

== Club career ==
Born in Conesa, San Nicolás Partido in the province of Buenos Aires, Argentina, he started his career at a local clubs of lower leagues: Chacarita Juniors, Conesa FC, Deportivo Armenio, General Rojo UD and CSD La Emilia. In July 2008, at the invitation of his cousin Cristian Menín, Rinaldi moved to San Marino and joined Campionato Sammarinese side S.S. Virtus. In 2010 he returned to Argentina when he played for Conesa FC. He remained there until summer 2012 when he joined S.P. La Fiorita. In January 2014 he went on trial with four China League One clubs but was not offered a contract.

By 2017, he was captain of La Fiorita as they reached the final of the Coppa Titano to play Tre Penne.

== International career ==
Due to having Sanmarinese roots through his grandfather, Rinaldi became the subject of interest from the San Marino national team and applied for citizenship of the country. Shortly after confirming him as Sanmarinese citizen he received his first call-up from Giampaolo Mazza. Rinaldi made his debut for San Marino after coming on as a substitute for Matteo Vitaioli in the 88th minute, in a 0–3 defeat against Czech Republic on 19 November 2008. He scored his first international goal, a penalty, in a friendly against Malta in a 2–3 home defeat on 14 August 2012.

=== International goals ===
Scores and results list San Marino's goal tally first, score column indicates score after each Rinaldi goal.

List of international goals scored by Danilo Rinaldi
No.	Date	Venue	Opponent	Score	Result	Competition
1	14 August 2012	San Marino Stadium, Serravalle, San Marino	Malta	2–3	2–3	Friendly

== Personal life ==
Rinaldi is married to Magalí Vivas and has a son. He is a brother of fellow footballer Federico Rinaldi He is also cousin to Cristian and Yésica Menín. Outside of football he has worked in a furniture shop.
