= Conesa, Buenos Aires =

Town in Argentina

Conesa
- Town and commune
- Location in Argentina
- Coordinates: 33°35′44″S 60°21′21″W
- Country: Argentina
- Province: Buenos Aires
- Partido: San Nicolás
- Foundation: 3 February 1884
- Founded by: Miguel Ibarra
- Elevation: 58 m (190 ft)

Population (2010)
  - Total: 2.066
- Postal code: B 2907
- Area code: +54 0336
- Website: Official website

Conesa is a town in San Nicolás Partido, Buenos Aires Province, Argentina. It is located next to National Route 188, 35 km from San Nicolás de los Arroyos, 43 km from Pergamino and a few kilometers from the border with Santa Fe Province, bordering the Santa Fe town of Juan Bernabé Molina.

== Etymology ==
Formerly the town was named after General Emilio Conesa, a prominent participant in the Argentine civil wars and in the fight against the indigenous people.

== Demographics ==
Conesa has 2,066 inhabitants (Indec, 2010), which represents a slight increase of 0.6% compared to the 2,047 inhabitants (Indec, 2001) in the previous census.

demographic vertical bar chart of Conesa between 1960 and 2010
Sources: INDEC

The town consists of 4 neighborhoods:

- Avellaneda: It is located in the southern part of the town.
- La Crema: It is located in the center of town.
- Peloduro: It is located in the northern part of the town.
- Pueblo Nuevo: It is the neighborhood that is on the other side of the railroad track.

== History ==
Founded on 3 February 1884, Conesa is the most important town of the towns that make up San Nicolás de los Arroyos Partido, it is located 37 km from said city and 42 km from the city of Pergamino. It had two names: "Pueblo Ibarra", honoring one of the first settlers, Don Miguel Ibarra, and "General Conesa", which was the name of the railway station. The Western Railway gave him the necessary boost to survive. Once the railway station was installed, the formation of the population began. At the beginning of the century it had some important businesses such as the firm Bustinz Osinaga & Cia. -San Nicolás branch- with a warehouse, store, hardware store, wooden corral, and agricultural machines; the Miranda y Torroba house with a general branch business; Genovio Ledezma, with coffee, billiards, and hair salons; José Irujo, with an inn, cafe, confectionery and store; José Subiza, grain and fruit collector; the suppliers Clementino Del Pozo and Albino Grisetti; Juan Toneguzzo, dedicated to masonry works; Emilio Vogliano, with restaurant; the Azcorra and Camou fuel warehouse; Alejandro Chambón's bakery, and other merchants such as Juan Perazzo, Germán Rodríguez and Ángel Peri. Saturnino and Dámaso Insaurralde, the latter owner of the historic ranch "La Esperanza", and the brothers Juan and Ramón Altolaguirre, were the first landowners who, together with others, worked their lands, contributing to the progress of the town.

Other surnames and families linked to the history of the town from its early times are: Rocha de Sánchez, Morales, Gutiérrez, Arteach, Mina, Mosto, Grant, Munárriz, Mignaco, Bona, Casasola, Ledesma, Borzata, etc.

On 25 November 1900, the annual celebration of popular pilgrimages began, which contributed to the spiritual expansion of the population for many years.

A great advance was made in 1903 by ordinance of 4 November, approving the establishment of public lighting with 25 oil-powered lanterns, inaugurated on the 10th of the same month. Already on February 13, the Municipal Revenue Office had been created, headed by Miguel Segovia.

On 25 December 1910, a large division of land (122 lots) owned by Ángel Francisco Robert was carried out, which was the first major land auction, expanding the town of Conesa, and thus giving rise to the "Pueblo Nuevo" neighborhood.

In 1921 the current Public Cemetery was inaugurated.

In 1922 the Conesa Foot-Ball Club was founded.

In 1927 the Conesa Agricultural Cooperative Limited began its activities.

In 1961 Plaza Independencia was inaugurated, changing its name years later to Plaza de la República. The Parish Temple was inaugurated in 1969. The Parish is dedicated to the adoration of the Sacred Heart of Jesus.

In 1972 the "Cruz del Sur" Traditionalist Center was inaugurated.

== Education ==
There are four educational establishments: School Number 14 Nuestra Señora del Carmen (primary). Conesa EES N18 Commercial Institute (secondary). Technical School Number 1 Juan Bautista Alberdi (secondary). Merceditas de San Martín Kindergarten Number 905 (initial level).

There is also a First Aid Room, where primary care and medical on-call are provided during the weekends.

The Municipal Delegation of Conesa is directed by Municipal Delegate Oscar Sequeira. There is also a Civil Registry of people and a Post Office.

== Catholic Church Parishes ==
Catholic Church
Diocese	San Nicolás de los Arroyos
Parish	Sagrado Corazón de Jesús

== Notable people ==
- Cristian Menín, footballer
- Yésica Menín, footballer
- Danilo Rinaldi, footballer
