= Bavagnoli =

Bavagnoli is an Italian surname. Notable people with the surname include:

- Elisabetta Bavagnoli (born 1963), Italian footballer and manager
- Gaetano Bavagnoli (1879–1933), Italian conductor
