= The Woman and the Puppet =

Novel by Pierre Louÿs

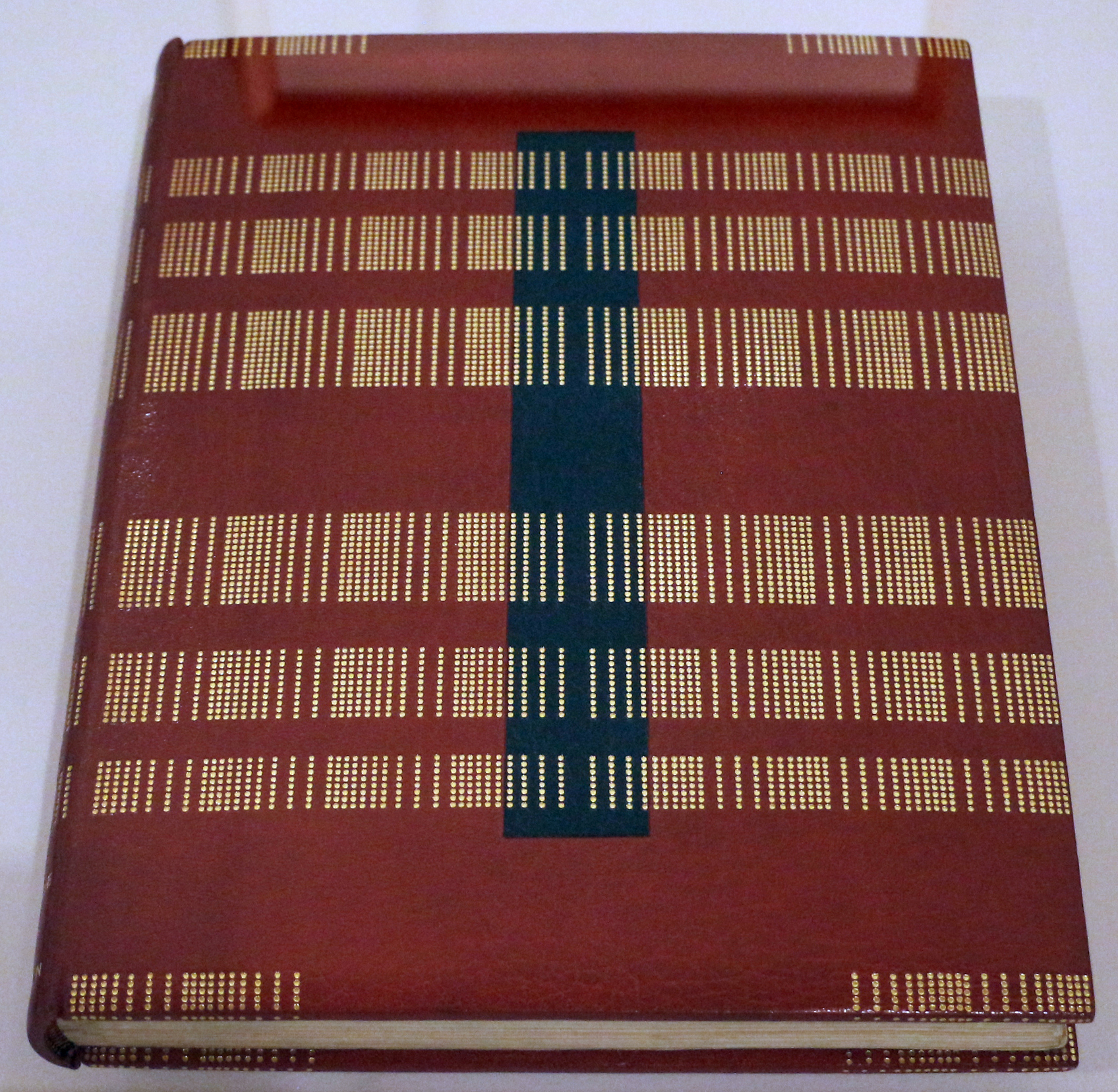
- Cover of 1928 Edition
- Author: Pierre Louÿs
- Original title: La Femme et le pantin
- Country: France
- Language: French
- Published: 1898

The Woman and the Puppet (La Femme et le pantin) is an 1898 novel by Pierre Louÿs.

== Synopsis ==
During the carnival in Seville, the Frenchman André Stévenol meets and falls under the spell of Concepción "Conchita" Pérez, a young Andalusian woman. His friend, don Mateo Diaz, warns him off by describing his own history with the woman – a history of being repeatedly attracted and then rebuffed by her. Conchita continually flirted with other men to torture don Mateo. On each occasion he was made to feel guilty for his jealous thoughts and actions towards her, until he realised finally that he had been her puppet for fourteen months and in an explosion of passion he beat her. She then astonished him by declaring the violence a sign of the strength of his love and came to his bed. She was a virgin. Although the two then started living together, she continued her flirtatious behaviour towards other men and simultaneously became very possessive. Don Mateo left the country and travelled for a year to escape her.

The novel has a short epilogue, described as the moral of the piece. The Frenchman accidentally meets Conchita again, and they spend the night together. The next morning, as Conchita packs her bags for Paris, a note is received from don Mateo asking to be taken back into Conchita's good graces.

== Adaptation ==
An abridged version of the story in English is included in Woman and Puppet, Etc. (1908), a collection of Louÿs works translated and/or adapted by G. F. Monkshood (William James Clarke), published by Greening & Co.

== Opera adaptation ==
- 1911 – Conchita, an opera in four acts and six scenes by composer Riccardo Zandonai, premiered in Milan at the Teatro dal Verme on 14 October 1911, with Tarquinia Tarquini in the title role.

== Film adaptations ==
- 1920 – The Woman and the Puppet – Reginald Barker, starring Geraldine Farrar
- 1929 – The Woman and the Puppet (La Femme et le Pantin) – Jacques de Baroncelli, starring Conchita Montenegro
- 1935 – The Devil is a Woman – Josef von Sternberg, starring Marlene Dietrich
- 1946 – The Lady's Puppet (Laabet el sitt, Egypt) – Wali Eddine Sameh, starring Tahia Carioca
- 1959 – The Female (La Femme et le pantin) – Julien Duvivier, starring Brigitte Bardot
- 1977 – That Obscure Object of Desire (Cet obscur objet du désir) – Luis Buñuel, adapted by Jean-Claude Carrière, starring Fernando Rey, Ángela Molina, and Carole Bouquet
- 1990 – The Woman and the Puppet (La Mujer y El Pelele, France/Spain) – Mario Camus, starring Maribel Verdú and Pierre Arditi
- 2006 – The Woman and the Puppet (La Femme et le Pantin) – Alain Schwarzstein, starring Roger Hanin and Mélissa Djaouzi
