= Alejo Gelatini =

Argentine footballer

Personal information
- Full name: Alejo Noe Gelatini
- Date of birth: 7 August 1983 (age 43)
- Place of birth: Soldini, Argentina
- Height: 1.82 m (5 ft 11 1/2 in)
- Position: Midfielder

Youth career
- Liceo Argentino
- Unión de Pérez
- Renato Cesarini
- Mitre de Pérez

Senior career*
Years	Team	Apps	(Gls)
2002–2007	Tiro Federal	28	(1)
2004–2005	→ 9 de Julio (loan)	22	(2)
2008	Gandzasar Kapan		
2008	Central Córdoba	9	(0)
2009	Americano Carlos Pellegrini		
2009–2011	Hà Nội ACB		
2011	Americano Carlos Pellegrini		
2011–2012	Deportivo Roca	28	(2)
2012–2013	Alumni	18	(2)
2013–2014	General Rojo	8	(0)
- Cañadense
- * Club domestic league appearances and goals

Alejo Noe Gelatini (born 7 August 1983) is an Argentine footballer who plays as a midfielder. He is currently a free agent.

== Career ==
Liceo Argentino signed Gelatini to their youth system in 1988, with the midfielder having subsequent stints with Unión de Pérez, Renato Cesarini and Mitre de Pérez. In 2002, Gelatini joined Tiro Federal of Torneo Argentino A. He was part of the club's squad as they rose up to Primera B Nacional in 2002–03 as champions. Torneo Argentino B's 9 de Julio loaned Gelatini in 2004, with a total of two goals in twenty-two fixtures arriving for them. While with 9 de Julio, Tiro Federal were promoted to the Argentine Primera División. He subsequently made thirteen appearances in the top-flight before being released in 2007.

After departing Tiro Federal, Gelatini moved to the Armenian Premier League to play for Gandzasar Kapan. He had limited opportunities there, subsequently leaving to return to his homeland in 2008 with Primera B Metropolitana team Central Córdoba. Nine appearances followed. Gelatini had a spell with regional team Americano Carlos Pellegrini in 2009, prior to securing a move to Vietnam and Hà Nội ACB. He stayed until 2011, initially in V.League 2 before securing promotion to V.League 1. Gelatini then rejoined Americano before spells with Deportivo Roca, Alumni, General Rojo and Cañadense.

== Career statistics ==
As of 19 December 2018.

Club statistics
Club	Season	League			Cup (Note: Includes the Copa Argentina)		League Cup		Continental		Other		Total	
Club	Season	Division	Apps	Goals	Apps	Goals	Apps	Goals	Apps	Goals	Apps	Goals	Apps	Goals
Tiro Federal	2002–03	Torneo Argentino A	0	0	0	0	—		—		0	0	0	0
Tiro Federal	2005–06	Primera División	13	0	0	0	—		—		0	0	13	0
Tiro Federal	Total		13	0	0	0	—		—		0	0	13	0
9 de Julio (loan)	2004–05	Torneo Argentino B	22	2	0	0	—		—		0	0	22	2
Central Córdoba	2008–09	Primera B Metropolitana	9	0	0	0	—		—		0	0	9	0
Deportivo Roca	2011–12	Torneo Argentino B	28	2	0	0	—		—		2 (Note: Two appearances in the 2011–12 Torneo Argentino B play-offs)	0	28	2
Alumni	2012–13	Torneo Argentino A	18	2	1	0	—		—		2 (Note: Two appearances in the 2012–13 Torneo Argentino A play-offs)	0	21	2
General Rojo	2013–14	Torneo Argentino B	8	0	0	0	—		—		0	0	8	0
Career total			98	6	1	0	—		—		4	0	103	6

== Honours ==
Hà Nội ACB

- V.League 2: 2010
