= Teatro Comunale =

The name Teatro comunale is an Italian term for a theater house, or opera house. Many towns in Italy have a Teatro Comunale.

Notable opera houses known as Teatro Comunale include:

- Teatro Comunale Vittorio Emanuele, Benevento
- Teatro Comunale di Bologna
- Teatro Comunale di Chiaravalle, Chiaravalle, Marche
- Teatro Comunale di Cosenza, Cosenza
- Teatro Comunale Ferrara
- Teatro Comunale Florence
- Teatro Comunale (L'Aquila), L'Aquila
- Teatro Comunale San Gallo, Loreto, Marche
- Teatro Comunale Modena
- Teatro Comunale di Montecarotto, Montecarotto
- Teatro Comunale Alighieri, Ravenna
- Teatro Comunale Cilea di Reggio Calabria, Reggio Calabria
- Teatro Comunale Santa Maria del Mercato, Serra San Quirico
- Teatro Comunale Giuseppe Verdi, Trieste
- Teatro Comunale di Vicenza

== See also ==
- Teatro alla Scala (La Scala), Milan, Italy
- Teatro Municipal (disambiguation)
- List of opera houses, a worldwide list
