= La Emilia =

- Location in Argentina
- Coordinates: 33°21′S 60°19′W
- Country: Argentina
- Province: Buenos Aires
- Partido: San Nicolás
- Founded: 2 October 1892
- Elevation: 25 m (82 ft)

Population (2001 census [INDEC])
  - Total: 2,883
- CPA Base: B 2901
- Area code: +54 3461

La Emilia is a small town in the San Nicolás Partido of Buenos Aires Province, Argentina.

== Geography ==
La Emilia is located in the northern part of Buenos Aires Province, Argentina, within the San Nicolás municipality. It stretches along the banks of the Arroyo del Medio River, which forms the natural boundary between Buenos Aires and Santa Fe provinces.

== Sport ==
The town is home to Club Social y Deportivo La Emilia football club; the team play in the Torneo Argentino B (as of 2008) and are an immense source of pride to the community.
