= Teatro Municipal =

Teatro Municipal, Theatro Municipal, Théâtre Municipal or Teatro Municipale (= Municipal theatre) may refer to:

- Théâtre municipal d'Albi
- Teatro Municipal de Caracas
- Teatro Municipal de Chacao
- Théâtre municipal de Grenoble
- Théâtre municipal du Mans
- Théâtre municipal de Mont-de-Marsan
- Théâtre municipal d'Orange
- Teatro Municipal de Puerto Cabello
- Teatro Municipal de Valencia
- Teatro Municipal (Lima)
- Theatro Municipal (Rio de Janeiro)
- Teatro Municipal (Santiago)
- Theatro Municipal (São Paulo)
- Teatro Municipal (San Nicolás de los Arroyos)
- Teatro Municipale, Piacenza
- Teatro Municipale (Reggio Emilia)
