= Lala Pasquinelli =

Argentinian artist (born 1976)

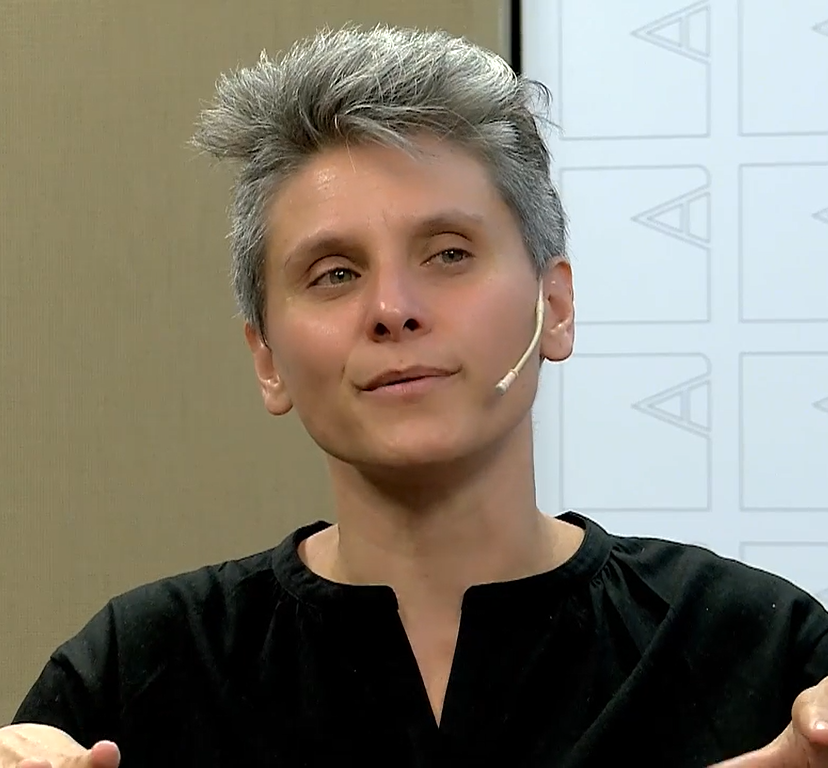
- Pasquinelli in 2019
- Born: María Laura Pasquinelli; 1976 (age 49–50); La Emilia, Buenos Aires, Argentina
- Occupations: Activist; lawyer; poet; artist
- Website: mujeresquenofuerontapa.com

María Laura Pasquinelli (born 1976), known as Lala Pasquinelli, is an Argentinian artist, poet, lawyer and activist. She is the founder of Mujeres Que No Fueron Tapa, an organization that critiques the representation of women in media. In 2023, she was listed in BBC's 100 Women list as one of the world's inspiring and influential women.

== Life ==
Pasquinelli was born in 1976, in La Emilia, to a lower-middle class family. When she was five, prompted by economic troubles, her family moved to Junín, Buenos Aires. Her grandfather opened a bakery, where she spent much of her time reading various magazines. The magazines mostly discussed celebrities and women's fashion, but in 1989, they discussed the campaign and election of Violeta Chamorro, the first female president of Nicaragua. Pasquinelli cited this experience, of learning it was possible for a woman to lead a country, as a very important one to her. She was part of the first generation in her family to attend college, and she practiced as a lawyer from 2000 to 2017. She left after realizing that she would rather pursue art and activism.

=== Mujeres Que No Fueron Tapa ===
In 2015, she helped to found Mujeres Que No Fueron Tapa (MQNFT), after wondering what her life would have been life if she'd grown up seeing more woman as politicians, activists, and scientists, as well as a more diverse array of female bodies. The organization was originally created as an art project by Pasquinelli, to critique how fashion affected woman. However, it quickly became more general, and moved to discuss the way in which women where represented in media and advertising, through the medium of visual art.

In 2017, she, alongside Melina Masnatta, a fellow activist, presented a seminar about cultural innovation. While there, she learnt about how technology could be used as a way to spread her message. As a result of this experience, she and MQNFT have collaborated with Wikimedia Argentina to produce the annual Festival de Hackeo de Estereotipos, a week-long event which seeks to teach children across Argentina how to identify gender stereotypes in the media. The name was inspired by the Hacker Manifesto. By 2018, the project has worked with over 250 schools. In 2023, the organization launched an English-language version of the program.

Pasquinelli also hosts a podcast with the same name, in which she interviews woman about their stories.

In 2023, she created the hashtag #HermanaSoltáLaPanza (Sister, stop sucking in your tummy), to talk about the widespread nature of dieting amongst women. She was noted as one of BBC's 100 Women for the year, as a result of her activism.

== Personal life ==
Pasquinelli is a lesbian.
