= Cristian Menin =

Argentine footballer (born 1982)

Cristian Menín
Personal information
- Full name: Cristian Rubén Menín
- Date of birth: February 7, 1982 (age 44)
- Place of birth: Conesa, Argentina
- Position: Forward

Senior career*
Years	Team	Apps	(Gls)
2001–2002	Almagro		
2002–2014	Chacarita		
2004–2005	Quilmes		
2005–2006	Armenio		
2007	Rangers Talca		
2007–2008	Pro Vasto		
2008–2009	Massese		
2009–2011	Tre Fiori		
2011–2013	Cosmos		
2013–20??	Tre Penne		
- * Club domestic league appearances and goals

Cristian Rubén Menín (born 7 January 1982) is an Argentine former professional footballer who played as a forward.

== Personal life ==
Menín is the brother of Yésica Menín and a cousin of Danilo Rinaldi and Federico Rinaldi. He has a Sammarinese great-grandfather.
