= Gustavo Echaniz =

Argentine footballer

Personal information
- Full name: Gustavo Pedro Echaniz
- Date of birth: 11 November 1960 (age 65)
- Place of birth: San Nicolás de los Arroyos, Argentina
- Height: 1.79 m (5 ft 10 1/2 in)
- Position: Forward

Senior career*
Years	Team	Apps	(Gls)
- Chacarita Juniors
- Lanús
- Unión de Santa Fe
- Chaco For Ever
- Colón de Santa Fe
- Almirante Brown
- Huracán
1983	St. Pölten		
1983–1984	Club América	37	(13)
1984–1985	Puebla FC	17	(2)
1985–1986	San Lorenzo		
1986–1987	Cobras de Querétaro	33	(6)
1989–1990	Unión de Santa Fe		

Managerial career
- –: Jorge Newbery
- 2012: Tiro Federal
- 2012: Alvear FBC
- * Club domestic league appearances and goals

Gustavo Pedro Echaniz (born 11 November 1955) is a former Argentine football player who played for numerous clubs in Argentina and in Mexico.

== Career ==
Echaniz played in the Primera División Argentina with Huracán, San Lorenzo and Unión de Santa Fe. He also played in the Argentine 2nd division with Chacarita Juniors, Lanús, Unión de Santa Fe, Chaco For Ever, Colón de Santa Fe and Almirante Brown.

He played overseas with Club América, Puebla FC and Cobras of Mexico and with St. Pölten of Austria.

After he retired from playing, Echaniz became a football coach. He managed Jorge Newbery de Comodoro Rivadavia and Tiro Federal before being appointed manager of Torneo Argentino B side Alvear Foot-Ball Club in September 2012.
