= Yésica Menín =

Argentine footballer (born 1989)

Personal information
- Full name: Yésica Soledad Menín
- Date of birth: July 5, 1989 (age 37)
- Place of birth: Conesa, Argentina
- Position: Striker

Senior career*
Years	Team	Apps	(Gls)
2012–	San Marino Academy		
- * Club domestic league appearances and goals

Yésica Soledad Menín (born 5 July 1989) is an Argentine former footballer who played as a striker for San Marino Academy.

== Early life ==
She has been nicknamed "Chechu". She figure-skated as a child. She studied business administration.

== Career ==
In 2012, she signed for Sammarinese side San Marino Academy. She captained club. She was regarded as one of their most important players. She helped them achieve promotion. She became the second Sammarinese player to play in the Italian top flight. She became the first Argentine to score in the Italian top flight.

== Style of play ==
She mainly operates as a striker. She has been described as an "assister rather than scorer".

== Personal life ==
She is a native of Conesa, Argentina. She obtained a Sammarinese passport. She has a Sammarinese great-grandfather. Her brother Cristian is a fellow footballer, like her cousin Danilo Rinaldi, who represented San Marino internationally.
