= Biblioteca Popular Rafael de Aguiar =

- 33.33741097369647°S 60.21769908086263°W
- Location: Argentina
- Type: Public
- Established: 1948

The Biblioteca Popular "Rafael de Aguiar is a public library created in 1947 by Juana Couretot de Guella and officially inaugurated in 1948 in honor of the founder of San Nicolás de los Arroyos. Its main mission is to provide the beneficts of reading habits, information and support to the educative work in its different levels.

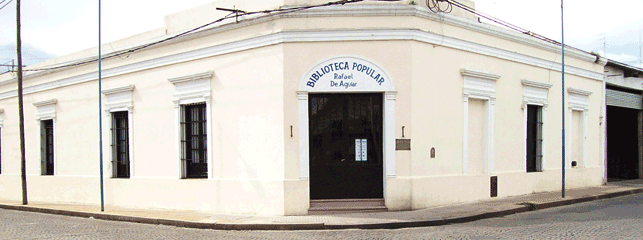
Front view of the Library "Rafael de Aguiar, San Nicolás de los Arroyos.

Through the time, this institution has developed different activities and started a large number of projects, transforming into one of the most important libraries of the city.
