= The Woman and the Puppet (1920 film) =

1920 film by Reginald Barker

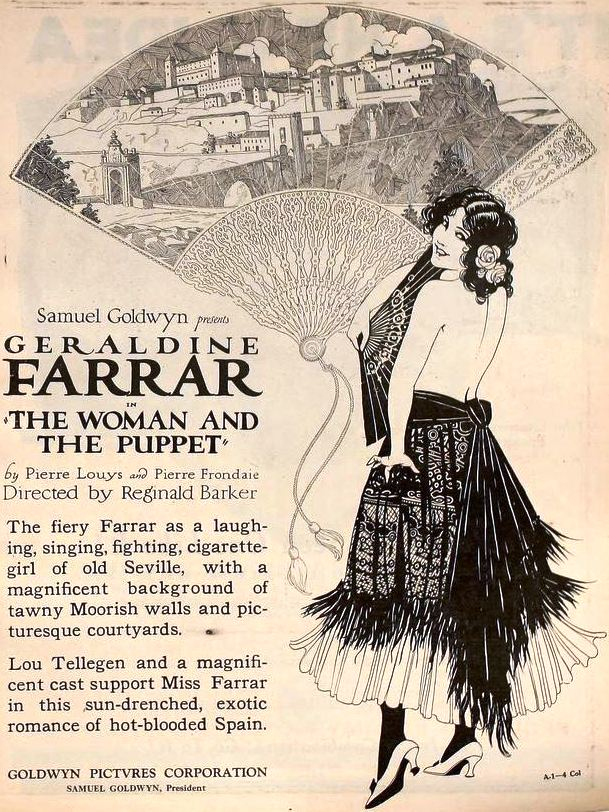
- 1920 advertisement for film
- Directed by: Reginald Barker
- Written by: Pierre Frondaie (play); J. G. Hawks; Pierre Louÿs (novel La femme et le pantin)
- Based on: The Woman and the Puppet by Pierre Louÿs
- Produced by: Samuel Goldwyn
- Starring: Geraldine Farrar; Lou Tellegen
- Cinematography: Percy Hilburn (French)
- Distributed by: Goldwyn Pictures
- Release date: April 4, 1920
- Running time: 70 minutes
- Country: United States
- Language: Silent (English intertitles)

The Woman and the Puppet is a 1920 American silent film starring Geraldine Farrar and Lou Tellegen that was directed by Reginald Barker and produced by Samuel Goldwyn.

== Plot ==
Based upon a review in a film publication, Don Mateo attempts to bribe the mother of Concha Perez so that he can use her as his toy, but Concha leaves and becomes a cigarette girl who dances at a wharf cafe. When Don Mateo discovers her there dancing for some Englishmen, he no longer believes that she is the virtuous maiden who spurned his advances.

Concha convinces him that his suspicions are wrong and unwarranted. The Don is a conceited person used to adulation of senoritas, and when Concha leads him on a chase and vamps him, he becomes enraptured. The lovers then have a series of quarrels, jealousies, and other mishaps until they reach a final understanding.

== Cast ==
- Geraldine Farrar as Concha Perez
- Lou Tellegen as Don Mateo
- Dorothy Cumming as Bianca
- Bertram Grassby as Philippe
- Macey Harlam as El Morenito
- Cristina Pereda as Pepa
- Amparito Guillot as Mercedes
- Milton Ross as Miguel
- Rose Dione as Concha's Mother

== Preservation status ==
This film is extant in several film archives.
