= General Rojo =

- Town
- Location within Buenos Aires Province
- Coordinates: 33°28′S 60°17′W
- Country: Argentina
- Province: Buenos Aires
- Partidos: San Nicolás
- Established: April 20, 1890
- Elevation: 118 m (387 ft)

Population (2001 Census)
  - Total: 2,466
- Time zone: UTC−3 (ART)
- CPA Base: B 2905
- Climate: Dfc

General Rojo is a town located in the San Nicolás Partido in the province of Buenos Aires, Argentina.

== History ==
General Rojo was founded on April 20, 1890. It was named after a rancher who donated land to allow for the construction of the town. Until 2012, only the main roads in the town were paved.

== Economy ==
A 12 ha (30 acres)-large thermal power station operated by MSU Energy, an Argentine company which employs around 400 people in a series of three plants, which were built in 2017 and expanded in 2019.

== Population ==
According to INDEC, which collects population data for the country, the town had a population of 2,466 people as of the 2001 census.
