= Club Social y Deportivo La Emilia =

Argentine sports club

La Emilia
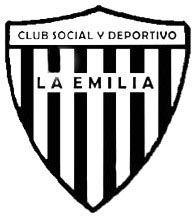
- Full name: Club Social y Deportivo La Emilia
- Nickname: Los Pañeros
- Founded: October 2, 1981; 44 years ago
- Ground: Estadio Jacinto "Gato" López, San Nicolás, Argentina
- Capacity: 6,000
- League: Torneo Argentino B
- 2010–11: 4th
- Website: http://www.clublaemilia.com.ar
Home colours	Away colours

Club Social y Deportivo La Emilia is an Argentine sports club, located in the San Nicolás Partido of Buenos Aires Province. Its football team plays in the Torneo Regional Federal Amateur, the regionalised 4th division of the Argentine football league system.

== Titles ==
- Liga Nicoleña de Fútbol: (20)

1930, 1932, 1940, 1941, 1943, 1944, 1945, 1946, 1947, 1950, 1953, 1957, 1967, 1977, 2001, 2002, 2003, 2004, 2007 y 2011

== See also ==
- List of football clubs in Argentina
- Argentine football league system
