= Teatro Municipal (San Nicolás de los Arroyos) =

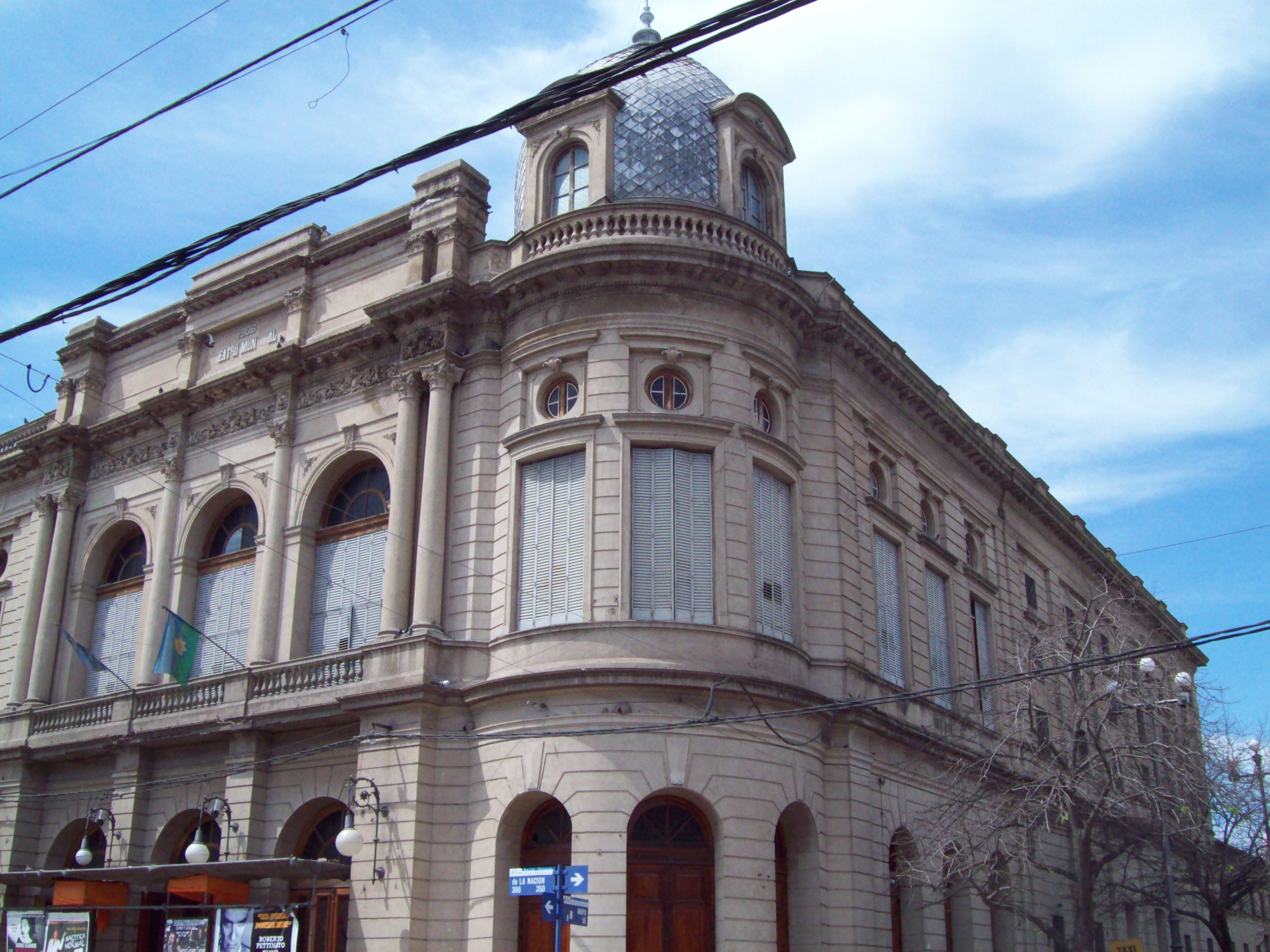

The Teatro Municipal (since 1958 also known as the Teatro Municipal Rafael de Aguiar) is a municipal theatre located in San Nicolás de los Arroyos, Argentina. It is that city's main venue for opera, ballet, and orchestral performances. Commissioned in 1905 and built from 1906 to 1908, the theatre was inaugurated on August 10, 1908, with a performance of Giacomo Puccini's Manon Lescaut with Gaetano Bavagnoli conducting.

== Sources ==
- "San Nicolás de los Arroyos - 250 años", Buenos Aires, Editorial Capuz Varela, 1998.
- "San Nicolás de los Arroyos. 250 años. La Historia de una ciudad", San Nicolás, Diario El Norte, 1998.
- "Crónica de San Nicolás de los Arroyos (1608-1988), Gregorio Santiago Chervo, San Nicolás, Ediciones del Museo y Archivo Histórico Municipal "Primer Combate Naval Argentino", 1988.
