= Pasquinelli Homes =

Home building company in the US

- Type: Private
- Industry: Home construction
- Founded: 1956 in Chicago, Illinois
- Founders: Bruno and Anthony Pasquinelli
- Defunct: 2011
- Headquarters: Burr Ridge, Illinois
- Area served: Nationwide
- Brands: Portrait Homes, Normandy Homes
- Services: Home construction
- Owners: Bruno and Anthony Pasquinelli

Pasquinelli Homes was a Chicago, Illinois based home building company, founded in 1956 by brothers Bruno and Tony Pasquinelli. Other family members helped establish the company's growth including their brothers Jim and Mike, and cousin Jerry Spezia. In 2007, it was the fifth largest privately owned home building company in the United States (per number of units sold) according to Builder Magazine's 2007 Builder 100 report.

The company initially built only in the Chicago area, but expanded to Colorado and Florida in the early 1970s. Poor market conditions i forced it to stop construction in Florida in 1976, and Colorado in 1986. In 1988, the company began building in Charlotte, North Carolina under the name Portrait Homes. Subsequently, Pasquinelli has expanded that brand to markets in South Carolina, Indiana, Texas, Ohio, Georgia, West Virginia and Pennsylvania.

The company closed its operations in February 2009 and was liquidated in 2011.

== PCM Mortgage ==
In October 2003, the company partnered with Wells Fargo Home Mortgage to form Pasquinelli Company Mortgage (PCM), which is currently a preferred lender of the company's' Midwest divisions. oro and Charlotte, North Carolina markets.

== Bankruptcy ==
In 2010, Harris Bank said Bruno Pasquinelli (80) and his brother Anthony (76) took $87 million from their residential development business, turning their holding company into an "insolvent, empty box". In April 2011 Pasquinelli Homebuilding LLC filed for Chapter 7 bankruptcy liquidation. The company had apparently succumbed to the previous housing market crash. In U.S. Bankruptcy Court the company testified to having about $10 million to $50 million in liabilities and a bit more than $500,000 to $1 million in assets. In early 2021, the bankruptcy proceeding was settled.
