= The Woman and the Puppet (1929 film) =

1929 film

- Film poster
- French: La femme et le pantino
- Directed by: Jacques de Baroncelli
- Written by: Pierre Louÿs (novel); Pierre Frondaie (play); Jacques de Baroncelli
- Starring: Conchita Montenegro; Tristan Sévère; Henri Lévêque
- Cinematography: Louis Chaix
- Music by: Edmond Lavagne; Philippe Parès; Georges Van Parys
- Production company: Société des Cinéromans
- Distributed by: Pathé Consortium Cinéma
- Release date: 31 May 1929
- Running time: 110 minutes
- Country: France
- Languages: Silent; French intertitles

The Woman and the Puppet (French: La femme et le pantin) is a 1929 French silent drama film directed by Jacques de Baroncelli and starring Conchita Montenegro, Tristan Sévère and Henri Lévêque. It is an adaptation of the novel of the same name by Pierre Louÿs and the play of the same name by Pierre Frondaie.

== Cast ==
- Conchita Montenegro as Conchita
- Tristan Sévère as Don Mateo
- Henri Lévêque as André Stinvenol
- Jean Dalbe as Morenito
- Andrée Canti as Woman in Train
- Léo Joannon as Don Mateo's Friend

== See also ==
- List of early color feature films
