= Fox Theatre (Portland, Oregon) =

Former theater in Portland, Oregon, U.S.

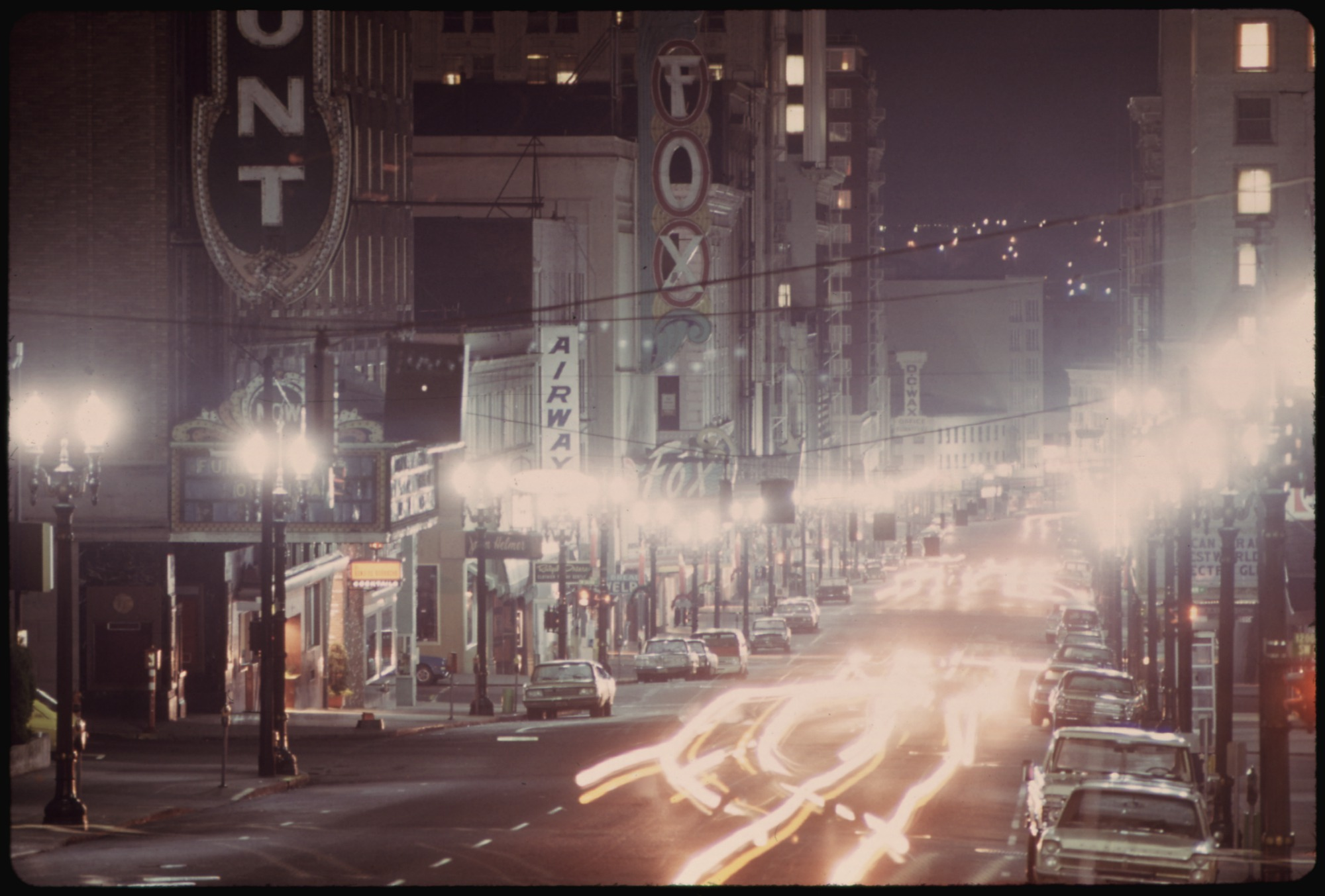
- Buildings on Southwest Broadway in Portland during the 1973 energy crisis.

- Location in Portland, Oregon
- Former names: Heilig; Rialto; Mayfair
- Location: Portland, Oregon, U.S.
- Coordinates: 45.51837°N 122.68043°W

Construction
- Opened: July 22, 1910
- Demolished: 1997

The Fox Theatre (formerly known as the Heilig, Rialto, and Mayfair) was a theatre building located at the intersection of Southwest Broadway and Taylor Street in Portland, Oregon, in the United States.

== History ==
The Heilig auditorium was designed by E. W. Houghton and opened on July 22, 1910. The theatre was initially used as an opera house, and notably staged a production of Zandonai's Conchita starring soprano Tarquinia Tarquini in 1912. The theatre was a frequent stop for the Lambardi Grand Opera Company; a touring opera company based out of California that was founded by impresario Mario Lambardi. The Boston Opera Company toured to the theatre in 1916; giving a performance of L'amore dei tre re starring soprano Maggie Teyte. In 1929, the Paramount-Publix chain began leasing the theatre and showing double feature film and vaudeville shows. The company added a marquee and talking equipment, but only operated the venue for two years due to the Great Depression. Under the J. J. Parker chain, the theatre was renamed the Mayfair. It hosted double features and road show stage performances

The Mayfair closed in October 1953 to undergo a nine-month restoration, becoming part of Fox West Coast Theatre's CinemaScope line of movie theaters. The local architectural firm Dougan and Heims oversaw the building's conversion. To promote the theatre's reopening, 20th Century Fox chartered an airplane and brought celebrities to Portland, including Rex Allen, Edward Arnold, Van Heflin, Rita Moreno, Mary Murphy, Johnnie Ray, and Mamie Van Doren. City and state officials, along with members of the public, greeted the celebrities at Portland International Airport. The venue, billed as the "Million Dollar" Fox Theatre, opened on August 12, 1954. It featured the second largest screen in the United States (two feet smaller than the screen at the Roxy Theatre in New York City). The theatre opened to the public the following day (August 13), screening Broken Lance (1954).

The Fox stopped screening films regularly in September 1990, then hosted occasional special events before the venue was demolished in 1997. The block is now occupied by the Fox Tower.
