= The Devil Is a Woman (1935 film) =

Film by Josef von Sternberg

- Theatrical release poster
- Directed by: Josef von Sternberg
- Screenplay by: John dos Passos
- Based on: The Woman and the Puppet; 1898 novel by Pierre Louÿs; 1910 play by Pierre Louys and Pierre Frondaie
- Produced by: Josef von Sternberg
- Starring: Marlene Dietrich; Lionel Atwill; Cesar Romero
- Cinematography: Josef von Sternberg
- Edited by: Sam Winston
- Music by: John Leipold; Heinz Roemheld
- Distributed by: Paramount Pictures
- Release date: March 15, 1935
- Running time: 79 minutes
- Country: United States
- Language: English

The Devil Is a Woman is a 1935 American romantic drama film directed and photographed by Josef von Sternberg from a screenplay by John Dos Passos, based on the 1898 novel The Woman and the Puppet by Pierre Louÿs. The film stars Marlene Dietrich, Lionel Atwill, and Cesar Romero. It marks the last of the six Sternberg–Dietrich collaborations for Paramount Pictures.

== Plot ==
During Carnival in early-20th-century Spain, the boulevards of Seville are jammed with revelers wearing grotesque costumes and masks. A detachment of Civil Guards stagger among the masquerading merrymakers. Antonio Galvan, a young bourgeois revolutionary home from his exile in Paris to visit his parents, mixes with the crowds while evading the authorities pursuing him. He makes eye contact with the dazzling Concha Perez, who is perched on a float in the parade. She flees into the crowd with Antonio in pursuit, and he is rewarded with a note inviting him to meet with her in person that evening.

Antonio runs into an old friend, Don Pasqual, a middle-aged aristocrat and former Captain of the Civil Guard. Learning of Antonio's infatuation with Concha, Pasqual solemnly relates, via a series of flashbacks, the details of how the young temptress ruined his life. After helping Concha quit her job at a cigarette factory, Pasqual proposed to her, but she disappeared after sending him a letter telling him she never wanted to see him again. Three months later, she returned to ask him for money, while insisting that she loved him, but she rejected his second proposal. Some time later, Pasqual, still in love with Concha, found her working as a singer in a nightclub. He later bought her out of her contract so they could be together, but she left with a young bullfighter. Due to his association with Concha, his reputation was tarnished, and he resigned his commission in disgrace.

Although Antonio promises to stay away from Concha, he goes to a nightclub with her, intending to exact revenge for Pasqual, but he is unable to resist her. While they are there, a letter is delivered to Concha from Pasqual, requesting to see her and declaring his undying love for her. She reads the letter to Antonio, who is incensed that his friend misled him. Just as Antonio kisses Concha, Pasqual bursts into their private room. Antonio accuses Pasqual of lying to avoid competition for Concha's affections, and Pasqual demands that Antonio leave town. Antonio then challenges Pasqual to a duel. After demonstrating his expert marksmanship with a pistol, Pasqual departs. Concha pledges to accompany Antonio to Paris after the duel and Antonio writes farewell letters.

Pasqual and Antonio meet at a secluded location the following morning. Concha tells Pasqual that, if he ever loved her, he could not kill "the only man I've ever cared for." When the duelists step to their positions, Pasqual points his pistol in the air, something that is not noticed by Antonio until after he fires. Pasqual is gravely wounded by Antonio's bullet. The police, notified of the illegal combat, arrive and arrest the fugitive Antonio. Pasqual is taken to the hospital.

Concha turns her charms on Governor Paquito to secure Antonio's release from prison, and he grudgingly issues two passports so Concha and Antonio can escape to Paris. Before reuniting with Antonio, she visits Pasqual at the hospital to thank him for sparing Antonio's life. He says his actions were proof of his love for her, but refuses to forgive her, so she leaves. She and Antonio make their way to the French border and pass through customs without incident. When their train arrives, Antonio eagerly enters their carriage, but Concha hesitates and informs the station master that she is not boarding. The shocked Antonio calls to her from the window of the moving train, and she announces she has decided to rejoin Pasqual.

== Cast ==
- Marlene Dietrich as Concha Pérez, a beautiful, piquant, and heartless cigarette factory worker and femme fatale who seduces and discards her lovers without remorse
- Lionel Atwill as Captain Don Pasqual Costelar, a middle-aged aristocrat and Captain of the Civil Guard. His conservative exterior conceals powerful salacious impulses.
- Edward Everett Horton as Governor Don Paquito, the despotic commander of Seville's police force, who is responsible for maintaining order during the festivities. He is susceptible to the charms of attractive women.
- Alison Skipworth as Señora Pérez, Concha's scheming mother
- Cesar Romero as Antonio Galvan, a young bourgeois revolutionary, one step ahead of Seville's police. He is narcissistic, yet good-natured, and lucky with women.
- Don Alvarado as Morenito, a young bullfighter with whom Concha had a brief affair
- Tempe Pigott as Tuerta
- Luisa Espinel as Gypsy dancer (uncredited)

== Production ==
The Devil Is a Woman is the last of Sternberg's seven quasi-autobiographical films featuring his star and muse, Marlene Dietrich. When Sternberg embarked upon filming The Devil Is a Woman, Paramount was experiencing falling profits. His latest film, the lavishly produced The Scarlet Empress, had proved unpopular with the public. Devil was completed on February 6, 1935, premiered without fanfare in March, and released to general audiences in May. Incoming production manager Ernst Lubitsch (who was replacing Ben Schulberg) announced that Sternberg's contract with Paramount would not be renewed.

The original title proposed by Sternberg for the film was Caprice Espagnol, a reference to Russian composer Rimsky-Korsakov's orchestral suite Capriccio Espagnol, of which several selections accompany the film. Lubitsch changed the title to The Devil Is a Woman. Sternberg later remarked: "Though Mr. Lubitsch's poetic intention to suggest altering the sex of the devil was meant to aid in selling the picture, it did not do so."

Approximately 17 minutes of footage, including a musical number in which Dietrich sang "If It Isn't Pain (It Isn't Love)", was cut from the film, reducing the total running time to 79 minutes.

Presumed for a time to be a lost film, a copy of the work was provided by Sternberg for a screening at the 20th Venice International Film Festival in 1959, and The Devil Is a Woman received a limited re-release in 1961.

== Themes ==
The Devil Is a Woman, in its "worldly attitude toward the follies of romantic infatuation", makes a mockery of Hollywood's standard plot devices that prevailed up to that time.

Ostensibly a light romance, the story examines that fate of a self-respecting and urbane older gentleman who foolishly falls in love with a beautiful woman indifferent to his adoration – and suffers for his passion. Sternberg's "grisly" tale is also a precise, unadorned and "heartless parable of man's eternal humiliation in the sex struggle." Dietrich, as a "devilish" and "devastating" Spanish joie de vivre, brandishes her cruelty with the rejoinder "If you really loved me, you would have killed yourself." The horror and pathos of the Don Pasqual character is that of a man in thrall to a woman who has no intention of satisfying his desires, and who perversely "derives amusement from his own suffering."

Sternberg leaves the interpretation of Dietrich's Concha a mystery: "One of the most beautifully realized enigmas in the history of cinema." Sternberg's attitude towards his male protagonists is less ambiguous. Both the pathetic old Don Pasqual and the virile young Antonio are regarded more with irony than sympathy: each are "symbols of the endless futility of passion...[t]hey are the last lovers Sternberg postulated for Dietrich's screen incarnation and their absurdity only marks the death of desire."

== Reception ==
"Camp is the outrageous aestheticism of von Sternberg's six American movies with Dietrich, all six but especially the last, The Devil Is a Woman"—Susan Sontag, from her essay "Notes on "Camp" (1964).

A box-office failure, panned by most contemporary critics for its perceived "caviar aestheticism and loose morals", the film's highly sophisticated rendering of a conventional romantic conceit left most audiences confused or bored.

Andre Sennwald, daily reviewer at The New York Times in 1935, defended Sternberg, describing the film as "one of the most sophisticated ever produced in America" and "the best product of the Dietrich–Sternberg alliance since The Blue Angel, while praising its "sly urbanity" and "the striking beauty of its settings and photography." Museum of Modern Art film curator Charles Silver regards The Devil Is a Woman as a veiled confessional of Sternberg's complex relationship with Dietrich. The leading male protagonists bear a striking physical resemblance to the director.

Film critic Andrew Sarris described The Devil Is a Woman as the "coldest" of Sternberg's films in its uncompromising, yet humorously cynical, appraisal of romantic self-deception. This, despite the film's "sumptuous surface". Silver remarks upon the film's "diamond-like hardness", where romanticism is trumped by "cynical introspection and fatalism".

On Dietrich's character, Concha Perez, Cecelia Ager, film critic for Variety, was "particularly lucid on the subject":

"Not even Garbo in the Orient has approached, for spectacular effects, Dietrich in Spain. ... Her costumes are completely incredible, but completely fascinating and suitable to The Devil Is a Woman. They reek with glamour ... Miss Dietrich emerges as a glorious achievement, a supreme consolidation of the sartorial, make-up and photographic arts."

Sarris summed up the film this way: "Sternberg did not know it at the time, but his sun was setting, and it has never really risen again...Still, as a goodbye to Dietrich, The Devil Is Woman is a more gallant gesture to one's once beloved than Orson Welles' murderous adieu to Rita Hayworth in The Lady From Shanghai."

Sternberg acknowledged that The Devil Is a Woman was "[m]y last and most unpopular of this series", while Dietrich herself cherished it as her favorite collaboration with Sternberg.

On the review aggregator website Rotten Tomatoes, 56% of 16 critics' reviews are positive, with an average rating of 7.7/10.

=== Accolades ===
The film won the award for Best Cinematography at the 3rd Venice International Film Festival in 1935.

=== Censorship ===
Upon its release, the Spanish Embassy issued protests to the US government that led Paramount Pictures to withdrawal the film from circulation and destroy available prints. The US Department of State also, with Spanish and American trade agreements in mind, pressured Paramount to stage a private burning of a "Master Print" of the film for the Spanish Ambassador in Washington, D.C. This diplomatic action was widely reported in Europe, but surviving prints of The Devil Is a Woman continued to be screened at domestic and overseas theaters.

In October 1935, Spain formally requested that Paramount cease international circulation of the film. A portion of the complaint cited a scene that showed "a Civil Guard drinking [alcohol] in a public cafe", and depicting the national police as buffoons, who appeared "ineffectual in curbing the riotous carnival". Studio head Adolph Zukor "agreed to suppress the film" and prints were recalled in November 1935. Sternberg's feature was marked as a film maudit (a cursed film) for many years. The film was subsequently outlawed in Francoist Spain.
