= Conchita (opera) =

Opera composed by Riccardo Zandonai

- Opera by Riccardo Zandonai
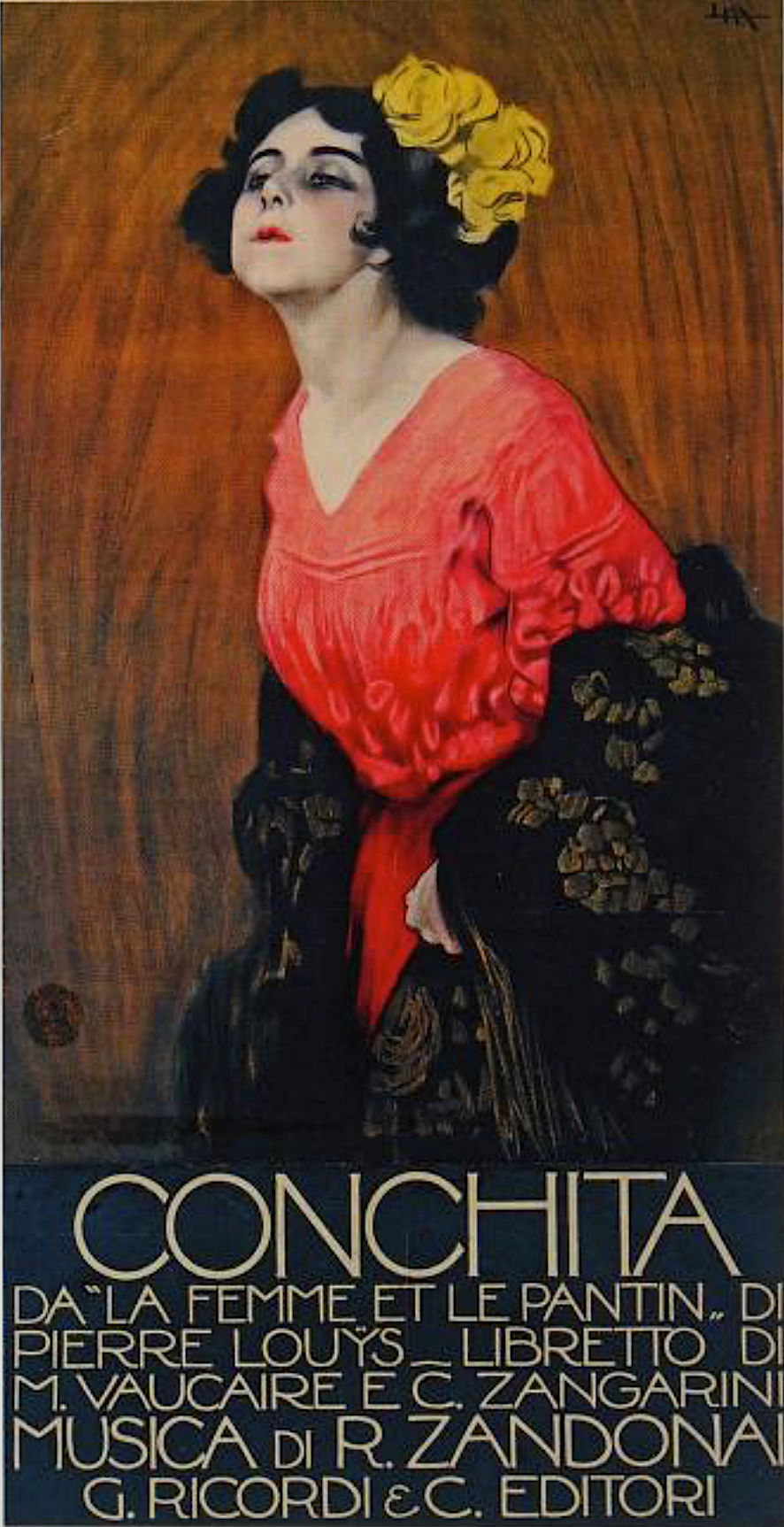
- Poster for the original 1911 production.
- Librettist: Maurizio Vaucaire; Carlo Zangarini
- Language: Italian
- Based on: Pierre Louÿs' The Woman and the Puppet
- Premiere: 14 October 1911; Teatro dal Verme

Conchita is an opera in four acts and six scenes by composer Riccardo Zandonai. The work uses an Italian language libretto by Maurizio Vaucaire and Carlo Zangarini which is based on Pierre Louÿs' 1898 novel The Woman and the Puppet.

The work premièred in Milan at the Teatro dal Verme on 14 October 1911 with soprano Tarquinia Tarquini, who later married Zandonai in 1917, in the title role. Her portrayal was lauded by critics and she went on to perform Conchita at the Royal Opera, London (1912), the Cort Theatre in San Francisco (1912), the Philharmonic Auditorium in Hollywood (1912), the Heilig Theatre in Portland (1912), the Metropolitan Opera House in Philadelphia (1912), the Chicago Grand Opera Company (1913), and the Teatro di San Carlo in Naples (1913). The opera was published by G. Ricordi & Co in 1912.

== Roles ==
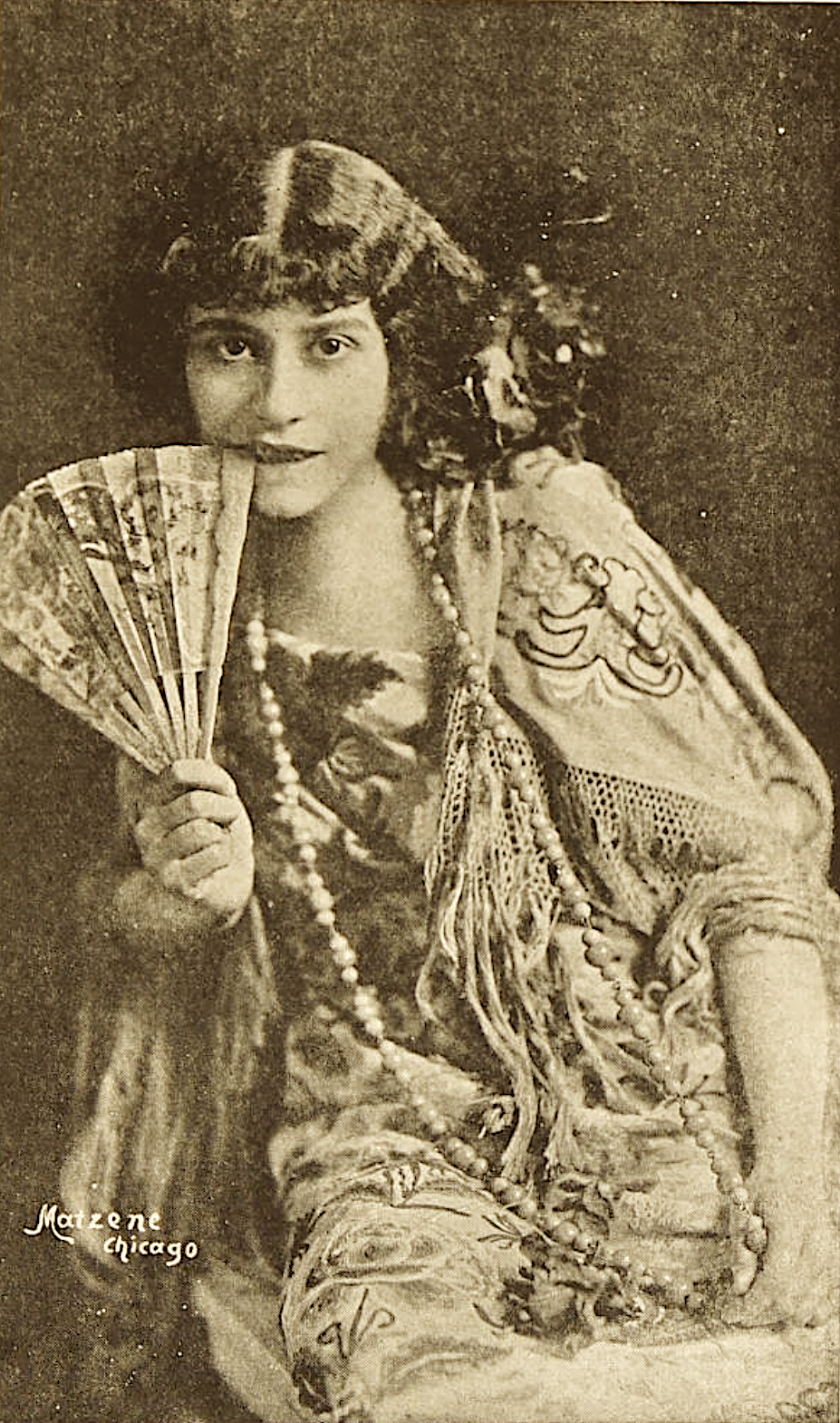
Tarquinia Tarquini as Conchita

Role	Voice type	Premiere Cast, 14 October 1911 (Conductor: Ettore Panizza)
Conchita	soprano	Tarquinia Tarquini
Mateo	tenor	Piero Schiavazzi
Rufina	mezzo-soprano	Ida Zinolfi
Dolores	soprano	Elvira Lucca-Cannetti
Estella	mezzo-soprano	
A merchant	tenor	Giuseppe Sala
A guide	tenor	Giuseppe Sala
Garcia	bass	Enrico Vannuccini
Sereno	bass	Enrico Vannuccini
Inspector	bass	Enrico Vannuccini
Tonio	bass	Aurelio Viale

== Synopsis ==
The story takes place in Seville.

Conchita Pérez, a poor cigar maker, is wooed by Matteo, but she resists his advances. Matteo pays her mother some money to relieve their poverty. Offended, Conchita escapes and becomes a somewhat famous flamenco dancer. Matteo tracks her down and continues his advances as she resists them. To prove his love, she organizes a meeting with a fake lover in front of Matteo who becomes very irate as a result. She finally has proof of his love for her, which she now can reciprocate.
