= Tarquinia Tarquini =

Italian opera singer

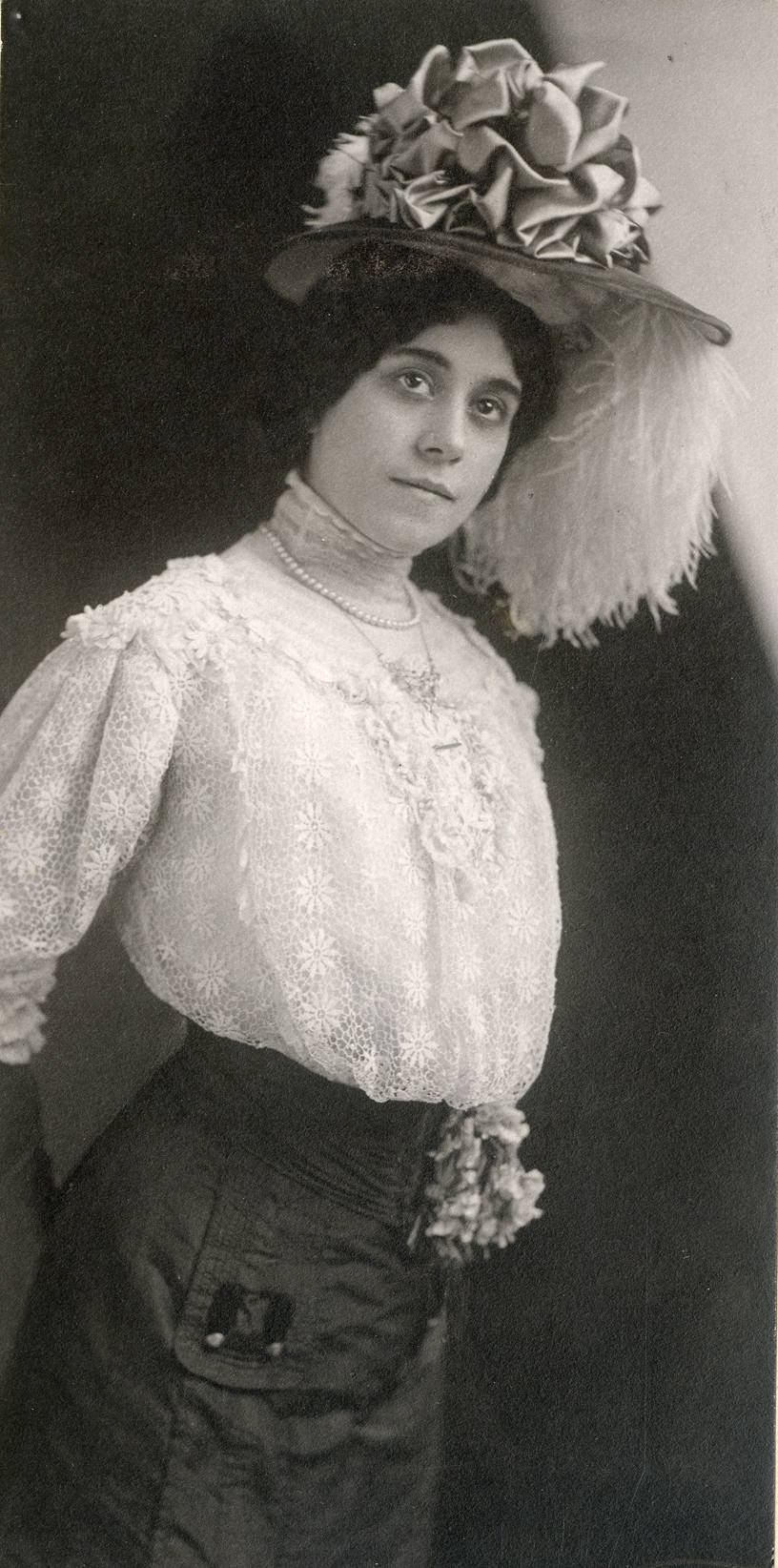
Tarquini in 1907

Tarquinia Tarquini (26 November 1882 – 25 February 1976) was an Italian dramatic soprano and the wife of composer Riccardo Zandonai. She is best remembered for creating the title role in world premiere of Zandonai's Conchita (1910); a role which she performed internationally. She had an important success at Covent Garden as Bizet's Carmen in 1912 and, besides Conchita, the title part in Richard Strauss's Salome was her most frequently assailed role.

== Early life and education ==
The daughter of Fulvio Tarquini and his wife Arduina Tarquini (nee Falini), Tarquinia Tarquini was born in Colle di Val d'Elsa on 26 November 1882. At an early age she moved with her parents to Siena where she grew up in a home located on Via del Paradiso. She began her vocal training in her native city in lessons with the nun Sister Silvestra who instructed her in religious music. She then trained in Siena with Giorgio Firaux. and privately in Florence with Giorgio M. Sulli. She also studied at the Milan Conservatory. She gave birth to a son, Ernesto Tarquini, on 17 July 1904 and it is speculated that Firaux may have been the father of her child.

== Career ==
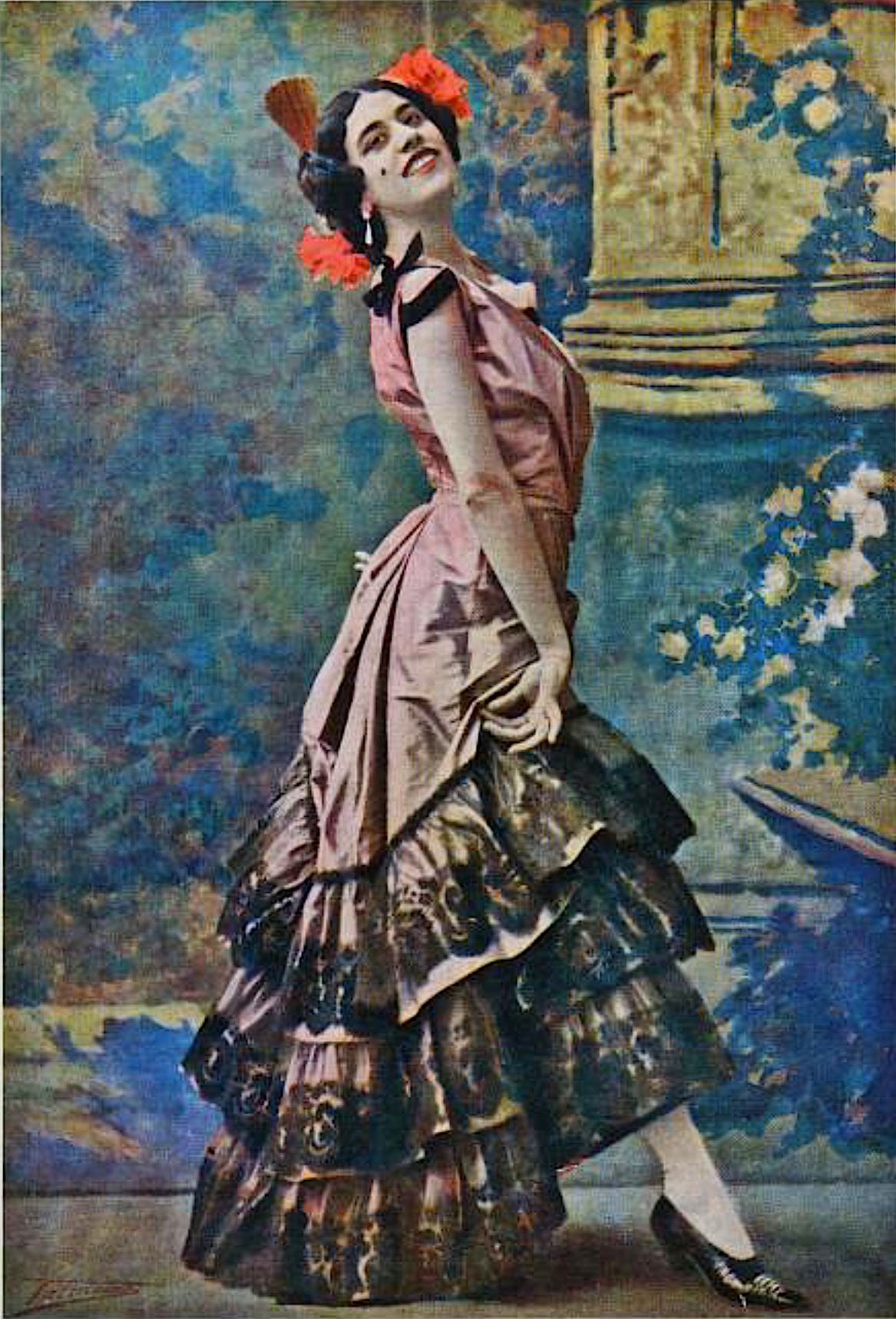
Tarquinia Tarquini as Conchita as depicted the illustration of "The Baille" from Act II of the opera by artist Giuseppe Palanti. Published in the original 1911 program for the Milan premiere.

In 1903 Tarquini made her debut at La Fenice as Santuzza in Cavalleria rusticana. She spent the next several years performing in opera houses throughout Italy. In 1906 Tarquini was brought to the United States by impresario Henry Russell to join his touring San Carlo Opera Company (SCOC). She made her debut with the company at the French Opera House in New Orleans as Santuzza in Cavalleria rusticana on November 22, 1906. This was followed by performances at the same theatre as Violetta in La traviata, Santuzza, Leonora in Il trovatore, Gioconda in La Gioconda, and the title role in the United States premiere of Adriana Lecouvreur.

In 1907 Tarquini tour with the SCOC for performances at Convention Hall in Kansas City, Missouri, the Odeon Theatre in St. Louis, Cincinnati Music Hall, the Auditorium Theatre in Chicago, the Auditorium Theatre in Los Angeles, Ye Liberty Playhouse in Oakland, California, Chutes Theater in San Francisco, the Heilig Theatre in Portland, Oregon, the Salt Lake Theatre in Utah, the Broadway Theatre in Butte, Montana, the Grand Opera House in Seattle, the Des Moines Auditorium in Iowa, the Detroit Opera House, the Jefferson Theatre in Portland, Maine, the Park Theatre in Boston, Massey Hall in Toronto, and the Théâtre National Français in Montreal. Her other repertoire with the SCOC included Micaëla in Carmen.

Between 1908 and 1911 Tarquini performed in operas in Austria, Egypt, Italy, and Portugal. Among the roles she sang were Cio-Cio San in Madama Butterfly, Maddalena de Coigny in Andrea Chénier, Mimì in La bohème, and the title role in Manon. She drew particular acclaim for her portrayal of the title role in Richard Strauss's Salome and, being a good dancer, was notably one of the first opera singers to perform the "Dance of the Seven Veils" herself; a move which shocked some conservative critics.

On 20 April 1912 she made her debut at the Royal Opera House (ROH) in London in the title role of Bizet's Carmen. The following July she returned to the ROH in the title part of Zandonai's Conchita; a work which she had previously performed at its world premiere on 14 October 1911 at the Teatro Dal Verme in Milan. Her performance was a triumphant success and she was brought by impresario Mario Lambardi to the United States to repeat the role in a lauded production at the Cort Theatre in San Francisco. There she also had success as Strauss's Salome and Bizet's Carmen. In the autumn of 1912 she repeated the roles of Conchita, Salome, and Carmen at the MacDonough Theatre in Oakland, California the Philharmonic Auditorium in Los Angeles, the Heilig Theatre in Portland, Oregon, and the Imperial Theatre in Vancouver. She ended the year performing these parts at the Moore Theatre in Seattle.

In 1913 Tarquini was a member of the Philadelphia-Chicago Grand Opera Company (PCGOC) which was led by Andreas Dippel. She made her debut with the company as Conchita at the Auditorium Theatre in Chicago on 30 January 1913. The following month she toured with the production to Philadelphia for performances at the Metropolitan Opera House in the city; followed by performances in the same role at New York's Metropolitan Opera House. She went on to perform the role of Conchita at the Teatro di San Carlo in December 1913.

== Later life ==
Tarquini remained busy as a performer up until her retirement from the stage in 1917 following her marriage that year to Zandonai. After her marriage, she lived most of her remaining life with her husband in Milan. She died in that city on 25 February 1976 at the age of 93. Tarquini's voice was never recorded.
