= San Nicolás de los Arroyos =

- City and Port
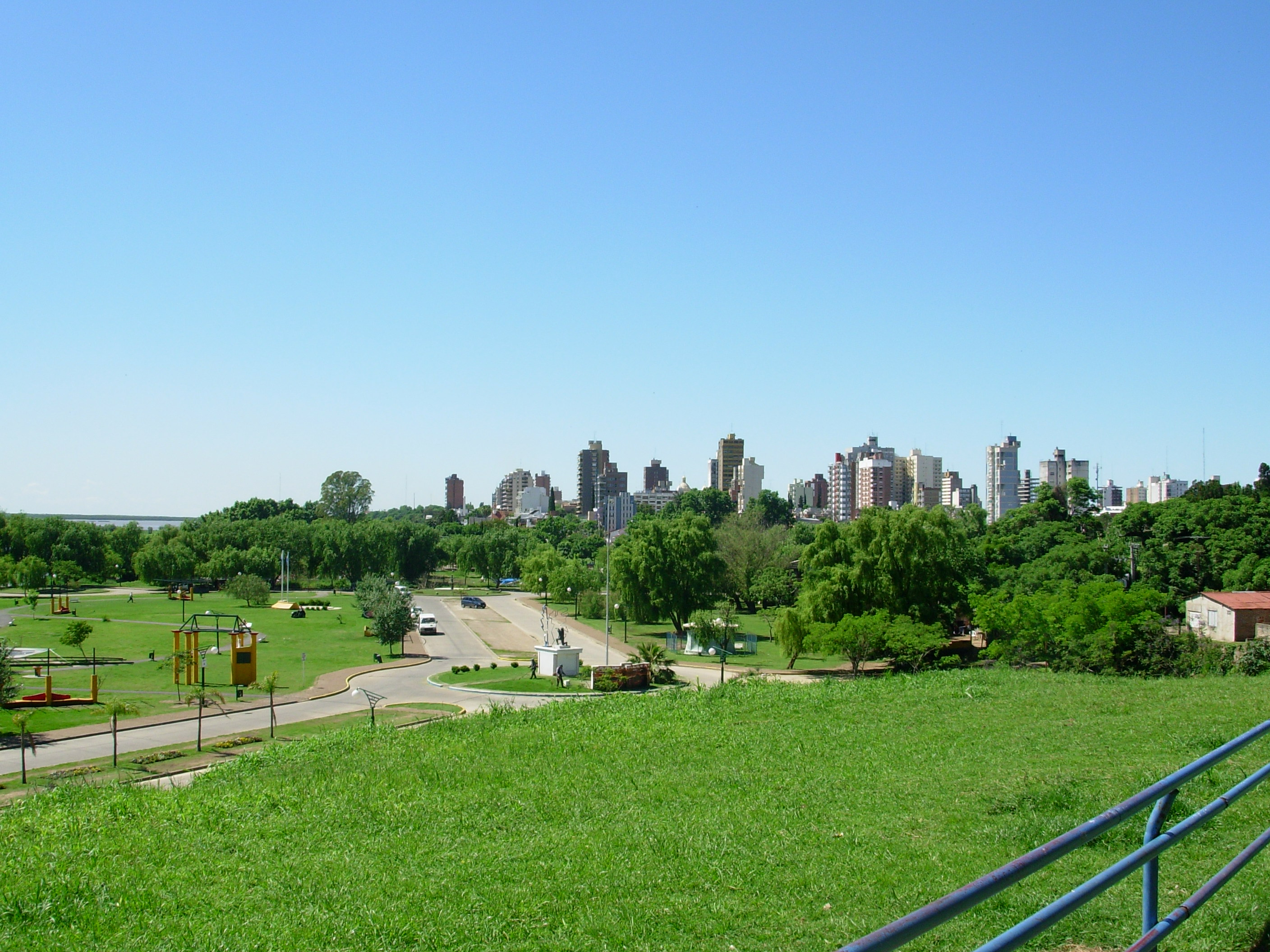

- Coat of arms

- Location of San San Nicolás de los Arroyos in Argentina San Nicolás de los Arroyos (Argentina)
- Coordinates: 33°20′S 60°13′W
- Country: Argentina
- Province: (Buenos Aires Province) Buenos Aires
- Partido: San Nicolás
- Founded: April 14, 1748
- Elevation: 17 m (56 ft)

Population (2010 census)
  - Total: 133,602
- CPA Base: B 2900
- Area code: +54 336
- Website: https://www.sannicolas.gov.ar/

San Nicolás de los Arroyos (usually shortened to San Nicolás) is a city in the province of Buenos Aires, Argentina, on the western shore of the Paraná River, 61 km (38 mi) from Rosario. It has about 133,000 inhabitants (2010 census [INDEC]). It is the administrative seat of the partido of the same name. It is sometimes called Ciudad de María (City of Mary) due to a series of Marian apparitions that led to the erection of the Sanctuary in honor of Our Lady of the Rosary of San Nicolás that began during the 1980s and were approved by Bishop Cardelli of the diocese as "worthy of belief" in 2016.

== History ==
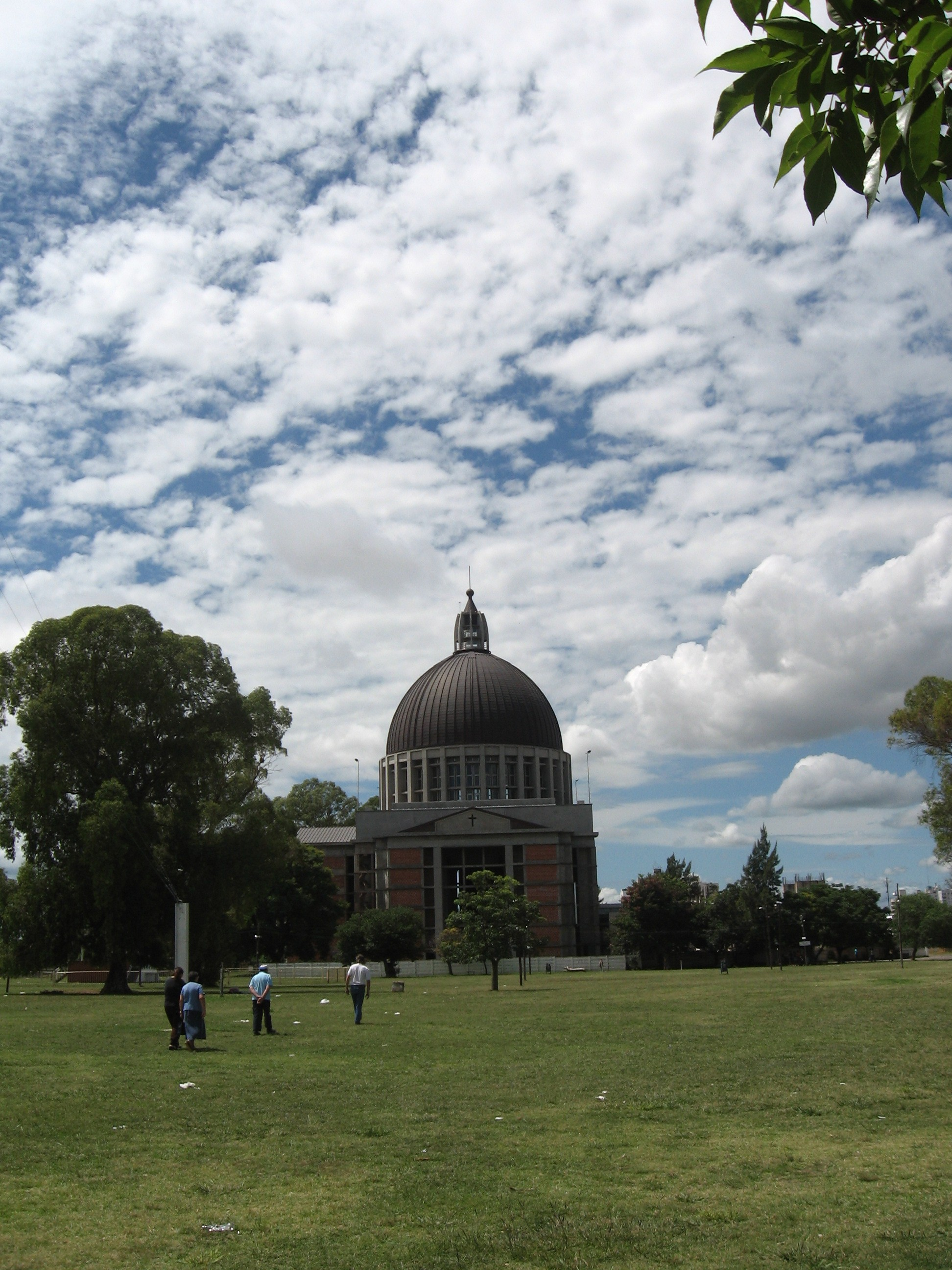
Sanctuary of Our Lady of the Rosary of San Nicolás

San Nicolás de los Arroyos was founded on April 14, 1748 by Rafael de Aguiar, who gave it its name to honor Saint Nicholas of Bari, now patron of the city.

The closeness to the border between Buenos Aires and two other large provinces made the city a natural stage for the struggle between federalist and Unitarians forces in mid-19th century. The agreement between thirteen provinces on May 31, 1852, which ratified the Federal Pact and called for a Constitutional Assembly sponsored by Justo José de Urquiza, was signed in this town, and became known as Acuerdo de San Nicolás de los Arroyos.

== Geography ==
The city is located in the north-east of the province of Buenos Aires, 240 km from Buenos Aires City, within the so-called Industrial Corridor that goes from Greater Rosario to La Plata. Its limits are: to the west, Pergamino; to the south, Ramallo; to the east, with the Paraná River, which separates it from the province of Entre Ríos; and to the north, with the Arroyo del Medio, a small river that separates it from the province of Santa Fe.

Its main accesses are in the north–south axis: the Rosario-Buenos Aires Highway, and the Nuevo Central Argentino railroad.

San Nicolás has an important port on the Paraná, able to service large cargo ships. The railway system has passenger and cargo stations, the latter reaching up to the port.

== Education ==
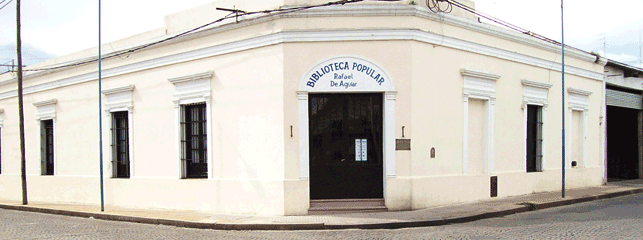
Rafael de Aguiar Public Library

The city has 43 kindergarten institutions, 58 schools of Elementary Education, 28 of High-school level (both public and private), 26 schools for adults and a large number of tertiary studies institutes. It is also home of the San Nicolás Regional Faculty, a branch of the National Technological University (UTN).

== Cultural life ==
There are a variety cultural institutions in the city, though the most important one is perhaps the Rafael de Aguiar Municipal Theatre, founded on August 10, 1908, and designed as a smaller model of the Teatro Colón in Buenos Aires.

Among the many libraries in the city, the oldest and largest is the Rafael de Aguiar Popular Library, founded in 1947 by Juana Couretot de Guella.

== City sights ==
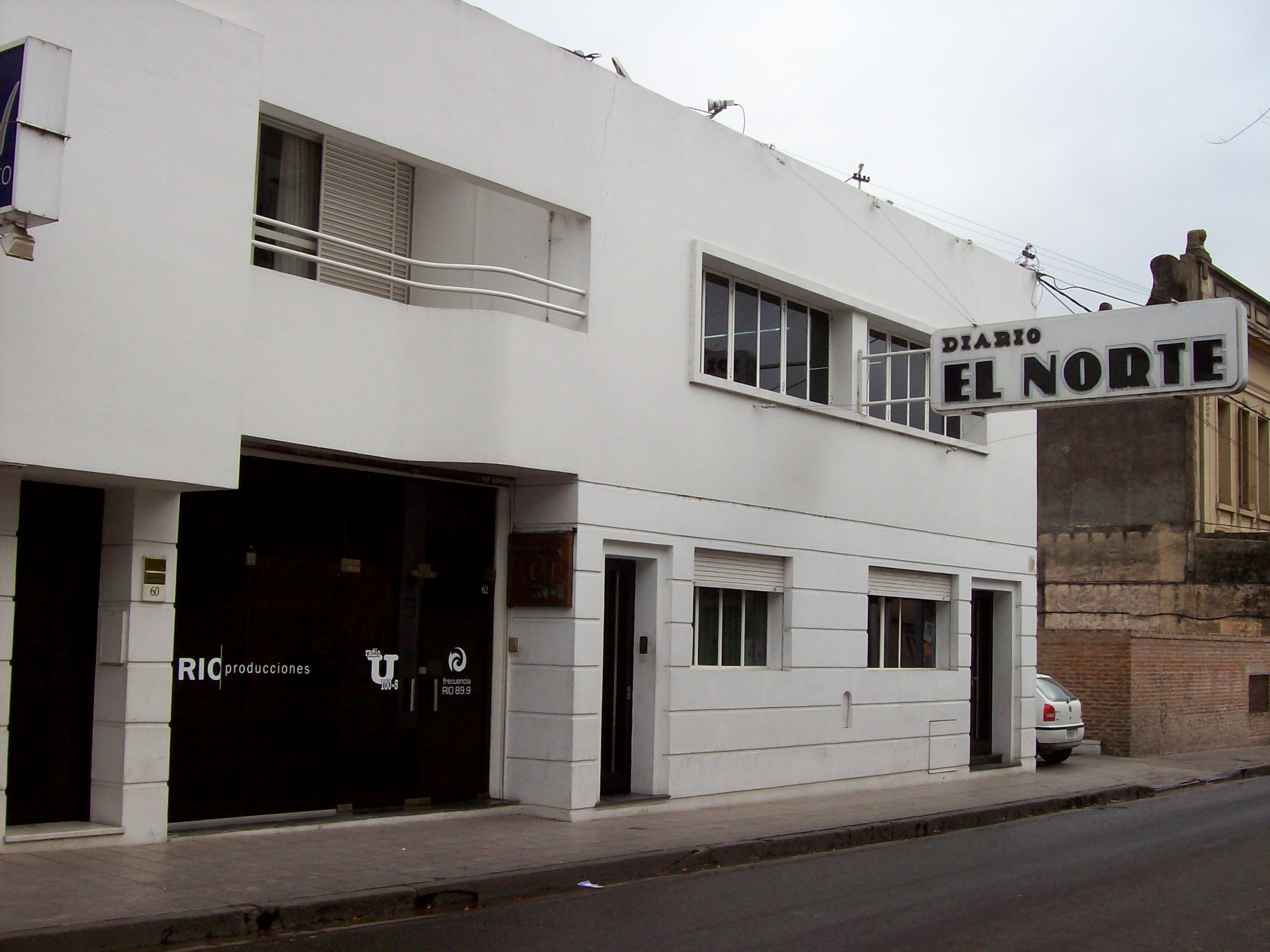
El Norte, the local news daily

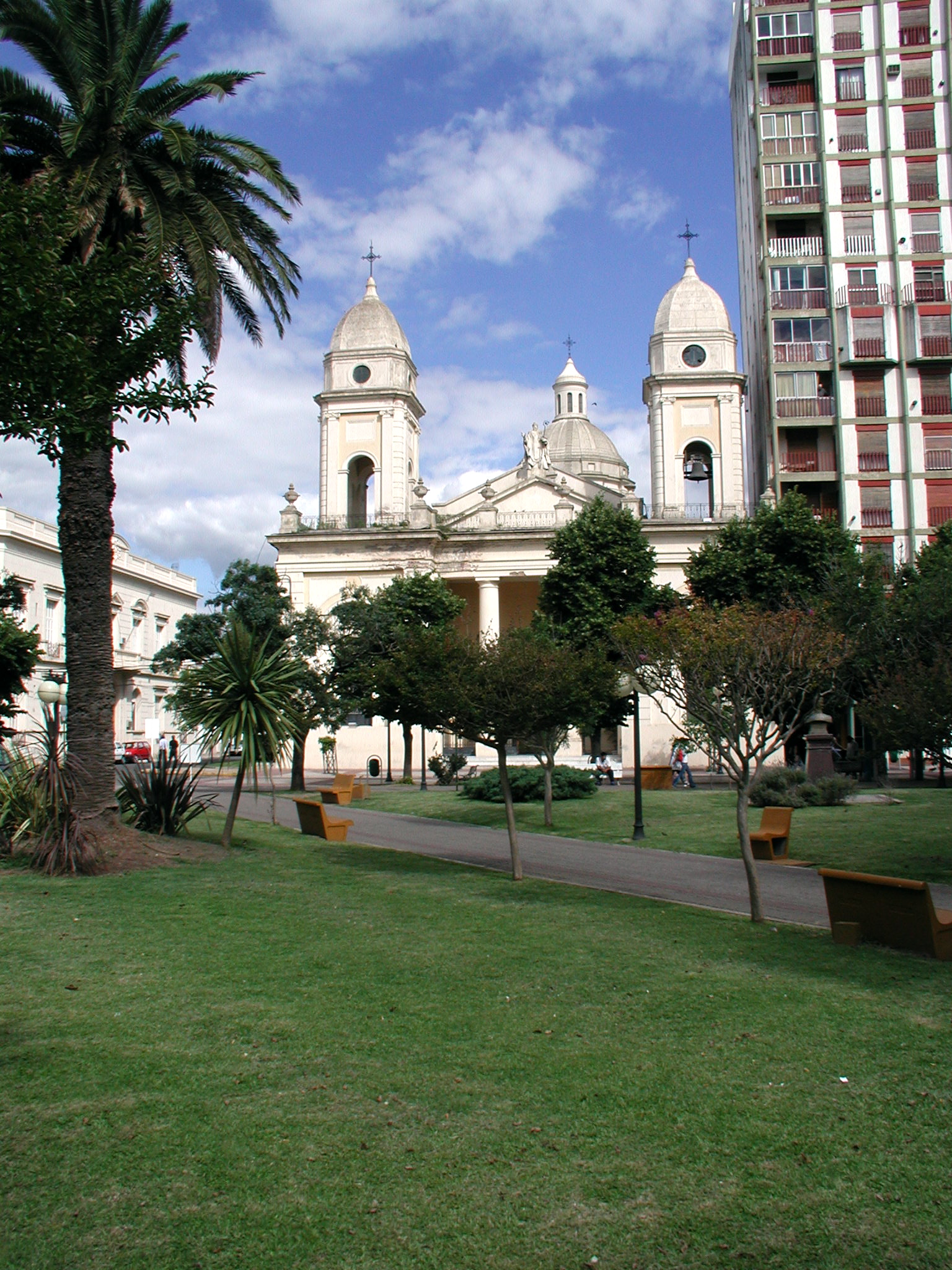
Mitre Square and the Cathedral of San Nicolás de Bari

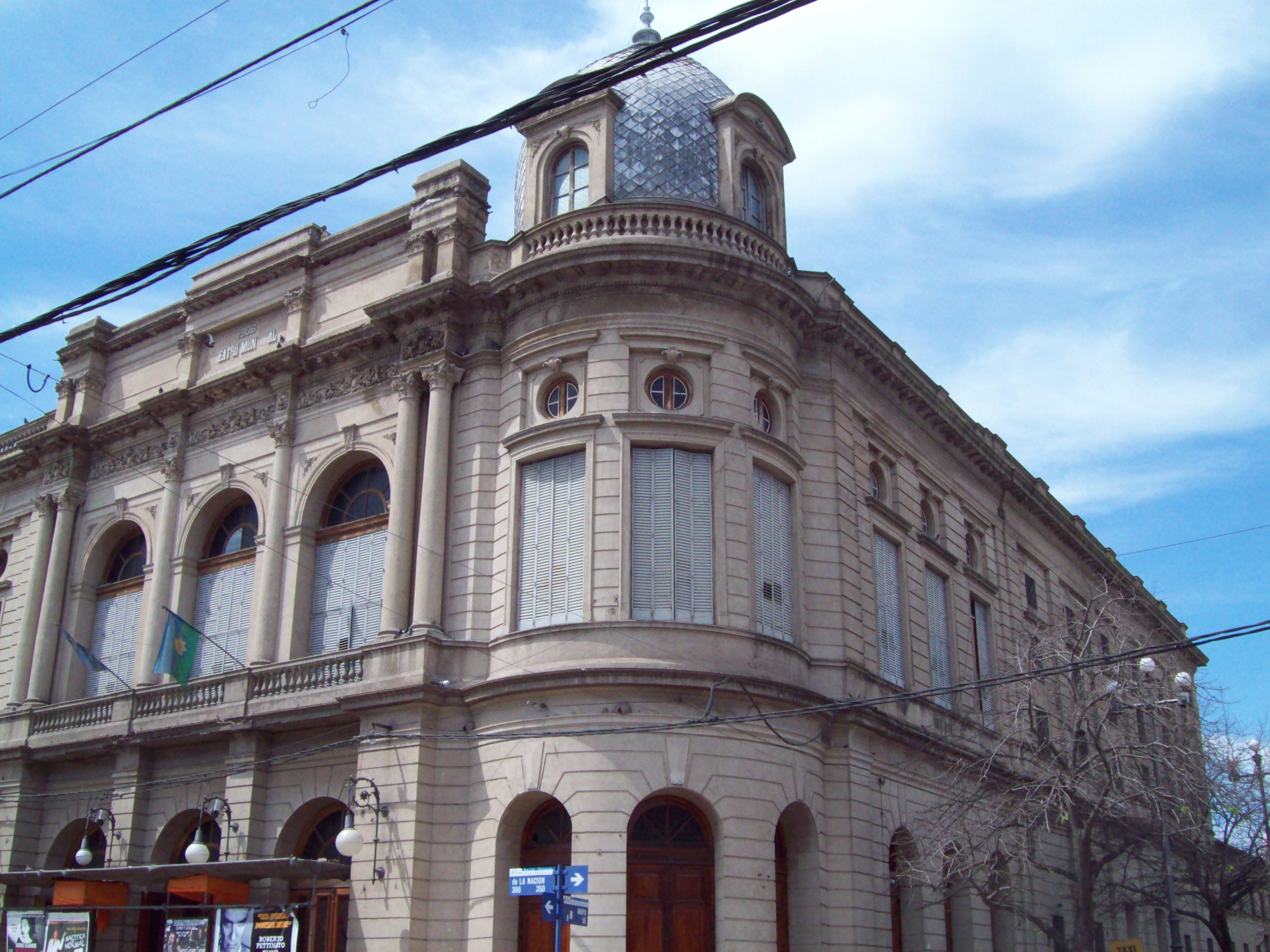
Municipal Theatre

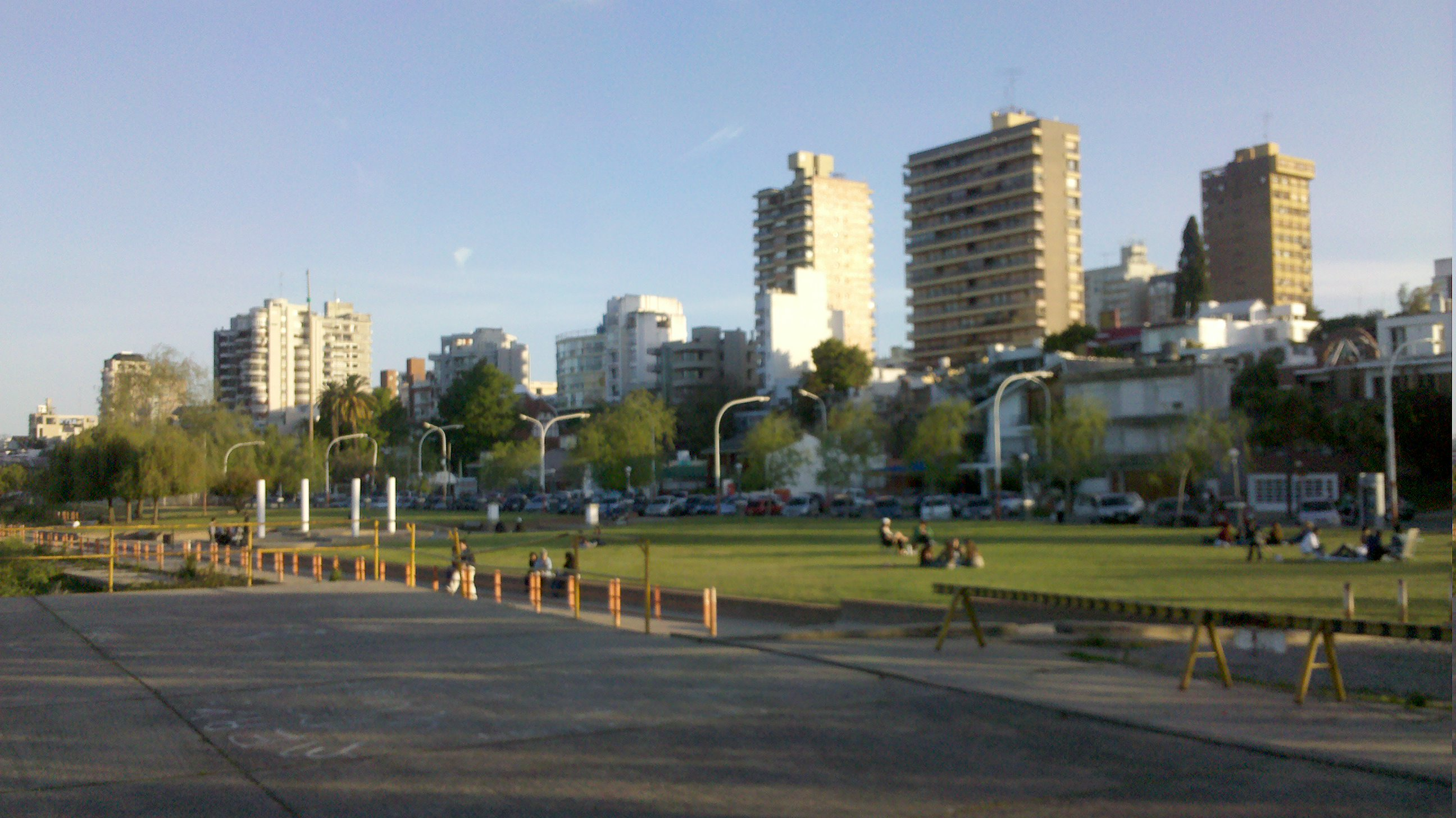
View from Riverfront

== Notable people ==
- Footballer Gustavo Pedro Echaniz
- Health Minister Ginés González García
- Journalist and short story writer Manuel Peyrou (1902–1974)
- Revolutionary and guerrilla leader Enrique Gorriarán Merlo (1942–2006)
- Football legend Omar Sivori
- Former football players Héctor Baley, Leo Franco, Patricio Hernández, Rubén Pagnanini, Andrés Guglielminpietro, Nelson Vivas and Bruno Marioni

== Notes and references ==
- This article draws material from the corresponding article in the Spanish Wikipedia.
