= Riccardo Zandonai =

Italian composer (1883–1944)

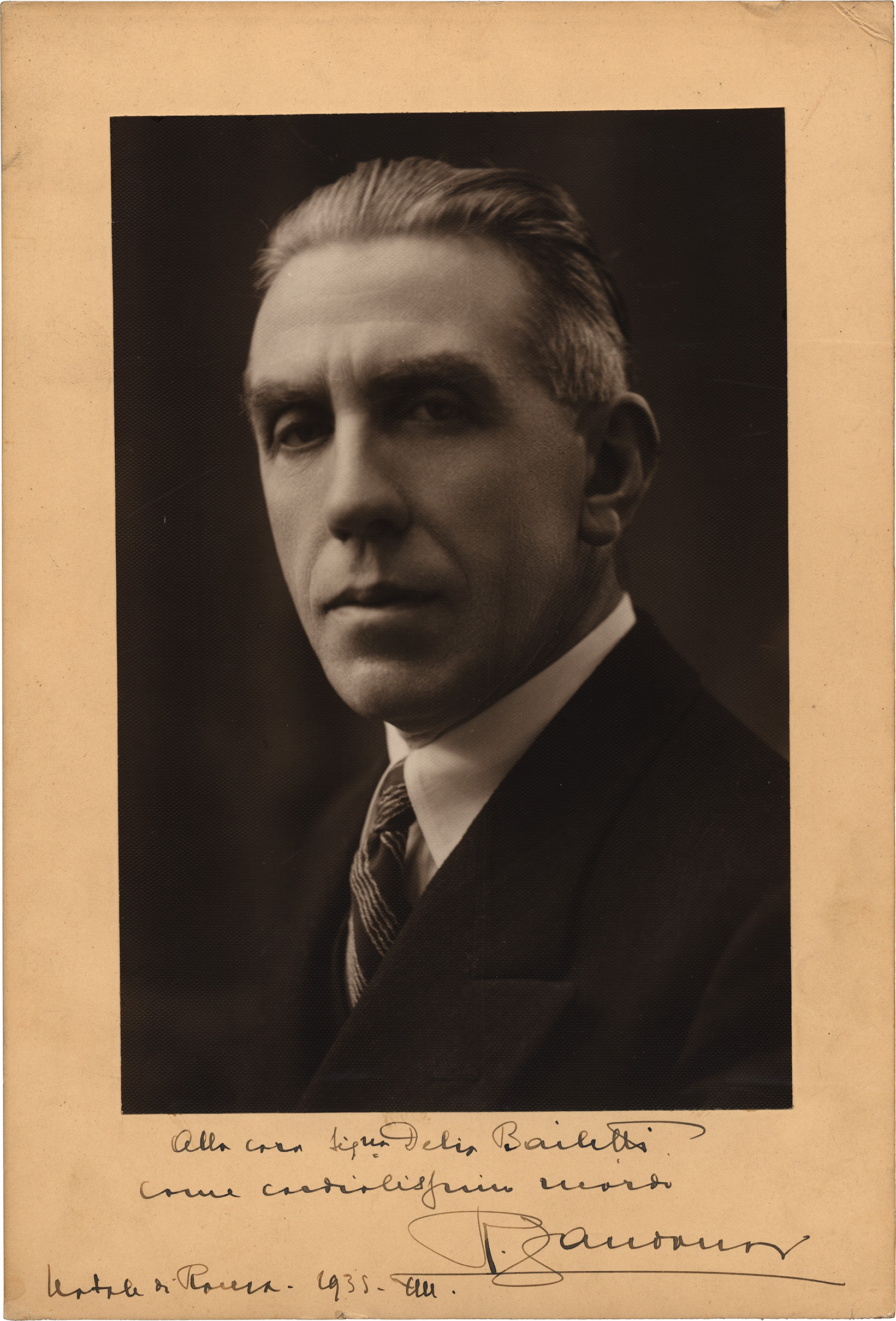
1935 photo of Riccardo Zandonai, with an autographed dedication

Riccardo Zandonai (28 May 1883 – 5 June 1944) was an Italian composer and conductor.

== Biography ==
Zandonai was born in Borgo Sacco, Rovereto, then part of Austria-Hungary. As a young man, he showed such an aptitude for music that he entered the Pesaro Conservatorio in 1899 and completed his studies in 1902; he completed the nine-year curriculum in only three years. Among his teachers was Pietro Mascagni, who regarded him highly.

During this period he composed the Inno degli studenti trentini, that is, the anthem of the organised irredentist youth of his native province. His essay for graduation was an opera named Il ritorno di Odisseo (The Return of Ulysses), based on a poem by Giovanni Pascoli, for singers, choir and orchestra. The same year 1902 he put to music another Pascoli poem, Il sogno di Rosetta. At a soirée in Milan in 1908, he was heard by Arrigo Boito, who introduced him to Giulio Ricordi, one of the dominating figures in Italian musical publishing at the time. His opera Il grillo del focolare has received occasional Italian performances since its premiere at the Politeama Chiarella di Torino in 1908.

Zandonai's fame rests largely on his opera Francesca da Rimini, a free adaptation of a tragedy which Gabriele D'Annunzio had written expanding a passage from Dante's Inferno; it has never fallen entirely from the repertoire, and has been recorded several times. Some time after the premiere, he married soprano Tarquinia Tarquini, for whom he had created the role of Conchita in the eponymous opera (dealing with a topic that Puccini had first considered and then rejected).

Soon, however, war broke out; patriotic Zandonai in 1916 composed a song, Alla Patria ("For the Motherland"), dedicated to Italy, with the result that his home and belongings in Sacco (then still in Austro–Hungarian hands) were confiscated (they were returned to him after the war).

When Puccini died without completing the music for the last act of Turandot, Zandonai was among several composers the Ricordi publishing firm considered for the task of finishing it. Puccini himself, in his final illness, seems to have supported the choice of Zandonai – certainly Toscanini looked with approval on this choice – but his son Tonio Puccini, for reasons still obscure, vetoed it. One version is that Tonio Puccini thought that Zandonai was too well-known and for that reason would be associated with the opera and might even overshadow his father. Ultimately Franco Alfano was chosen to complete Turandot.

In 1935 Zandonai became the director of the Rossini Conservatory in his beloved Pesaro. There he revived some works of Rossini, such as Il viaggio a Reims and the overture for Maometto secondo. In 1941 he re-orchestrated La gazza ladra, reducing it to three acts.

Three years later, he died in Trebbiantico (it), Pesaro, after undergoing gallstone surgery. His last words were for the priest who announced to him that Rome had been liberated the day before. The dying composer said, in his native dialect: "Good! Viva l'Italia; the sound part".

== Major works ==
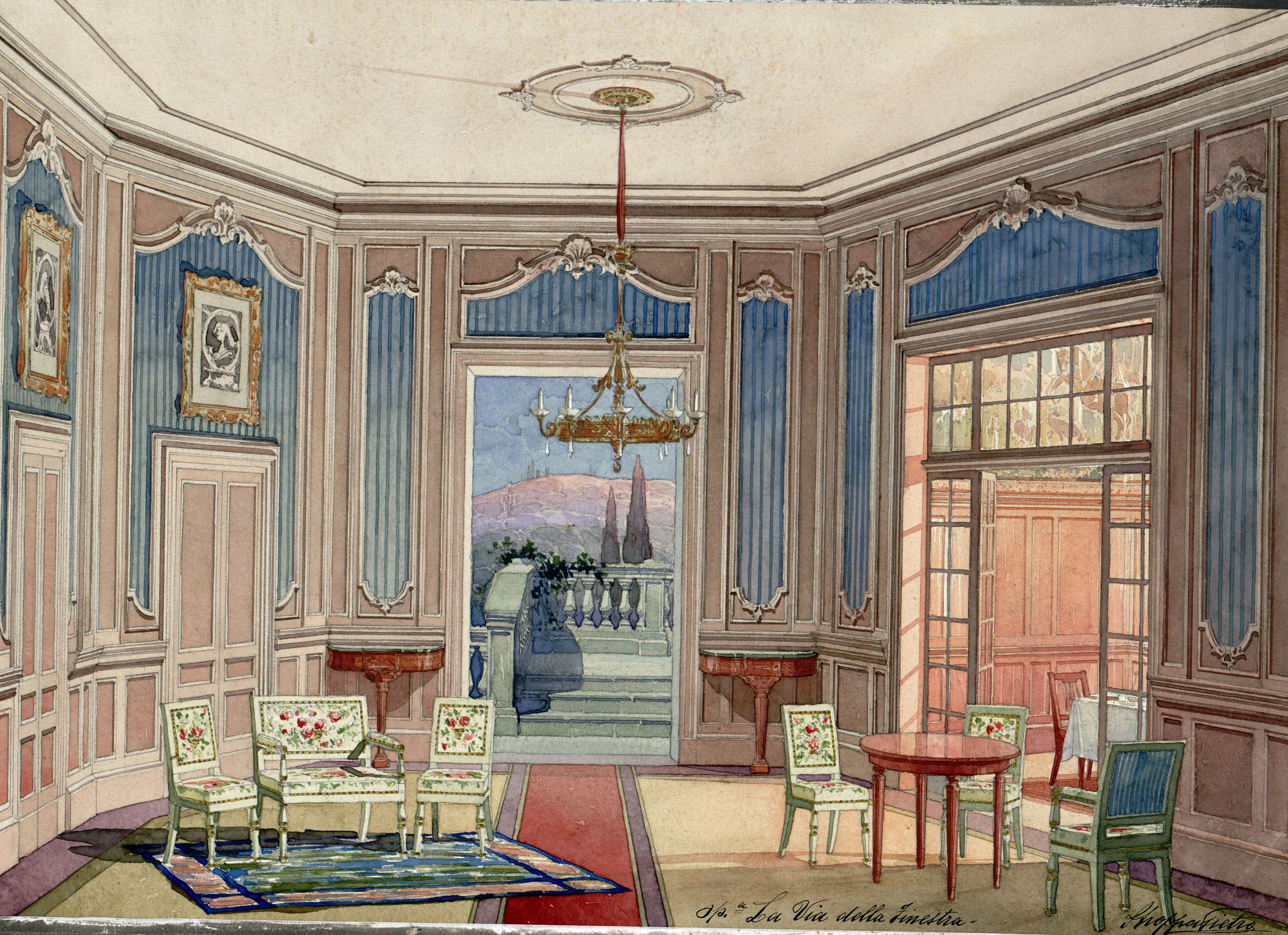
Una ricca sala al primo piano nel villino di Renato, set design for La via della finestra act 1 (1919).

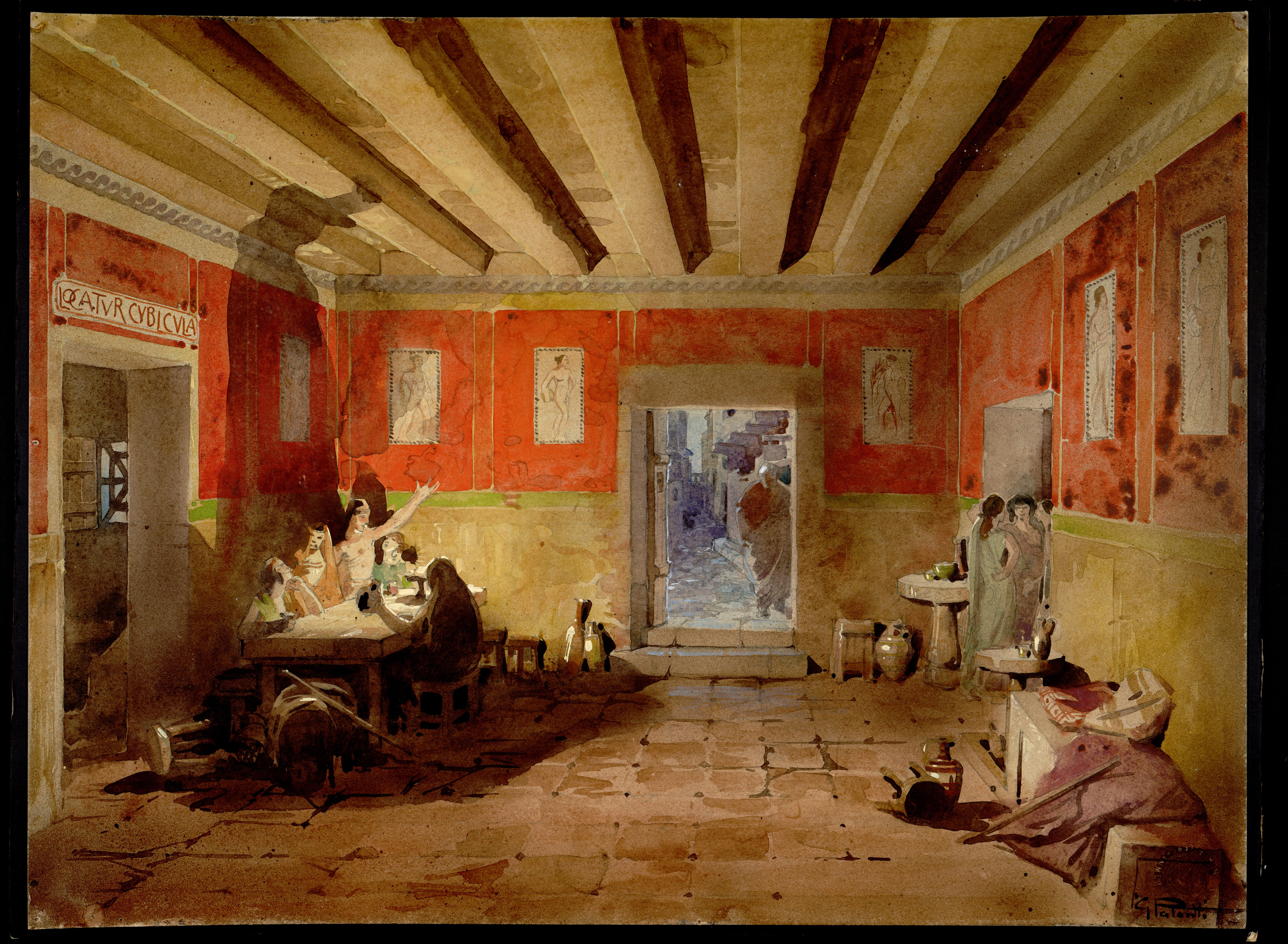
La taberna di Saturnino, nella Suburra, set design for Melenis act 1 (1912).

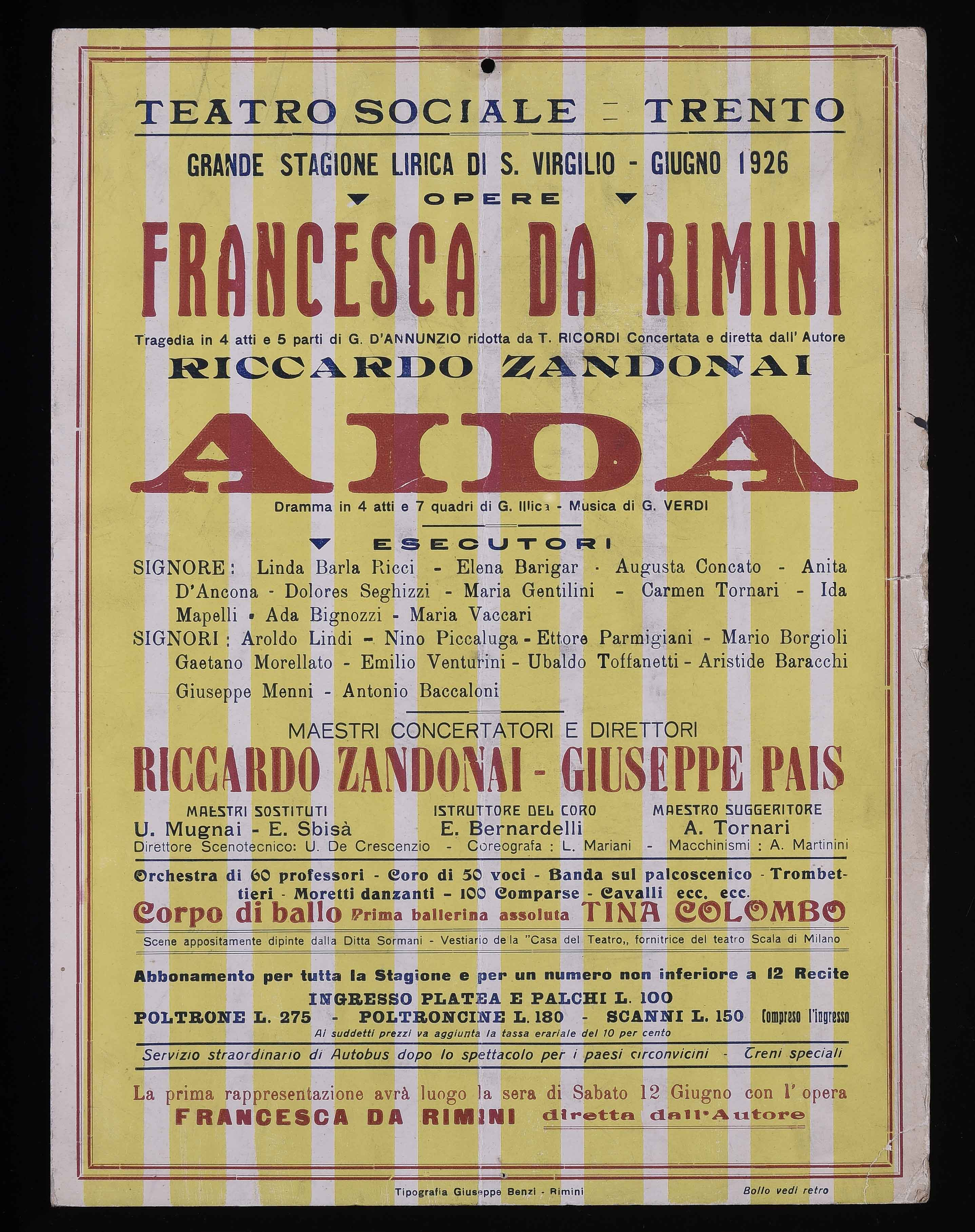
Zandonai cited in a theatre playbill preserved in Biblioteca comunale di Trento (Italy)

=== Operas ===
See List of operas by Riccardo Zandonai.

=== Sacred ===
- Te Deum for male choir and organ (1906)
- Two samplers of Melodie per canto e piano (1907, 1913)
- O Padre nostro che nei cieli stai for choir, organ and orchestra (1912)
- Messa da Requiem for choir (1914)
- Recently a Missa pro defunctis was discovered.

=== Other ===
Various symphonic compositions:

- "Primavera in Val di Sole"
- "Autunno fra i monti"
- "Ballata eroica"
- "Fra gli alberghi delle Dolomiti"
- "Quadri di Segantini" (1931)
- "Rapsodia trentina"
- "Colombina"
- Concerto romantico for violin (1919)
- Concerto andaluso for cello

== Selected filmography ==
- Princess Tarakanova (1938)
- Der singende Tor (1939)
- Love Me, Alfredo! (1940)
- Caravaggio (1941)
