= San Nicolás Partido =

San Nicolás de los Arroyos Partido de San Nicolás de los Arroyos
- Department
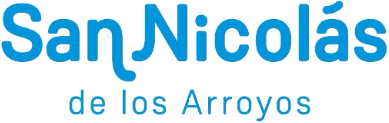

- location of San Nicolás Partido in Buenos Aires Province
- Coordinates: 33°19.79′S 60°13.79′W
- Country: Argentina
- Established: December 31, 1778
- Founder: Virrey Don Pedro de Cevallos
- Seat: San Nicolás de los Arroyos

Government
  - Intendant: Santiago Passaglia (PRO)

Area
  - Total: 1,183 km^{2} (457 sq mi)

Population
  - Total: 137,867
  - Density: 116.5/km^{2} (301.8/sq mi)
- Demonym: nicoleña/o
- Postal Code: B2900
- IFAM: BUE117
- Area Code: 03461
- Patron saint: San Nicolás de Bari
- Website: www.sannicolas.mun.gba.gov.ar

San Nicolás de los Arroyos Partido is the northernmost partido in Buenos Aires Province, Argentina.

The provincial subdivision has a population of about 200,000 inhabitants in an area of 1,183 km^{2} (457 sq mi), and its capital city is San Nicolás de los Arroyos, which is around 221 km (137 mi) from Buenos Aires.

== Settlements ==
- Campos Salles
- Conesa
- Erézcano
- General Rojo
- La Emilia
- San Nicolás de los Arroyos
- Villa Esperanza
