= List of South American metropolitan areas by population =

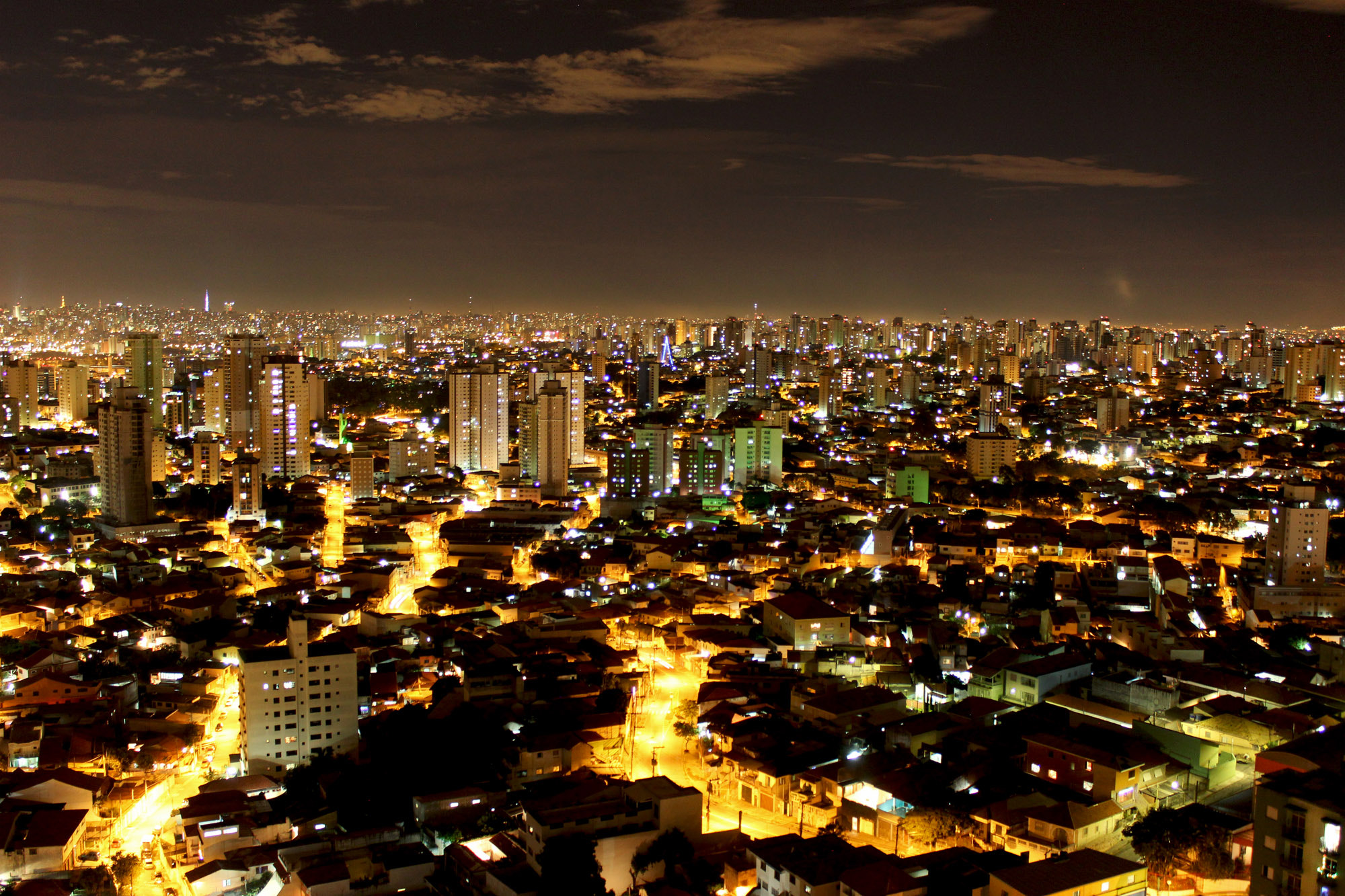
São Paulo, the most populated metropolitan area in a country outside Asia.

This is a list of the fifty most populous metropolitan areas in South America as of 2015, the most recent year for which official census results, estimates or projections are available for every major metropolitan area in South America. All figures refer to mid-year populations.

	Metropolitan area	Population	Year	Country
1	São Paulo	21,090,792	2015	Brazil
2	Buenos Aires	13,693,657 (Note: INDEC defines Greater Buenos Aires as comprising the Autonomous City of Buenos Aires plus twenty-four partidos of Buenos Aires Province, namely Almirante Brown, Avellaneda, Berazategui, Esteban Echeverría, Ezeiza, Florencio Varela, General San Martín, Hurlingham, Ituzaingó, José C. Paz, La Matanza, Lanús, Lomas de Zamora, Malvinas Argentinas, Merlo, Moreno, Morón, Quilmes, San Fernando, San Isidro, San Miguel, Tigre, Tres de Febrero and Vicente López.)	2015	Argentina
3	Rio de Janeiro	12,280,702	2015	Brazil
4	Lima	9,904,727 (Note: INEI defines the Lima Metropolitan Area as comprising Lima Province and the Constitutional Province of Callao.)	2015	Peru
5	Bogotá	9,286,225 (Note: DANE defines the metropolitan area of Bogotá as comprising the Capital District and seventeen municipalities in Cundinamarca: Soacha, Facatativá, Zipaquirá, Chía, Mosquera, Madrid, Funza, Cajicá, Sibaté, Tocancipá, La Calera, Sopó, Tabio, Tenjo, Cota, Gachancipá and Bojacá.)	2015	Colombia
6	Santiago	6,683,852 (Note: The government of the Santiago Metropolitan Region defines the metropolitan area of Santiago as comprising Santiago Province, Cordillera Province and two communes (Calera de Tango and San Bernardo) in Maipo Province.)	2015	Chile
7	Belo Horizonte	5,829,923	2015	Brazil
8	Caracas	5,322,310 (Note: Population projection is that of the Sistema Metropolitano de Caracas, which comprises the five municipalities of the Metropolitan District of Caracas as well as the Altos Mirandinos Metropolitan Area, Guarenas-Guatire conurbation, Litoral Varguense conurbation and Valles del Tuy Metropolitan Area.)	2015	Venezuela
9	Porto Alegre	4,258,926	2015	Brazil
10	Brasília	4,201,737	2015	Brazil
11	Fortaleza	3,985,297	2015	Brazil
12	Salvador	3,953,290	2015	Brazil
13	Recife	3,914,397	2015	Brazil
14	Medellín	3,777,009 (Note: Medellín's metropolitan area, officially known as the Metropolitan Area of the Aburrá Valley, comprises the municipalities of Barbosa, Bello, Caldas, Copacabana, Envigado, Girardota, Itagüí, La Estrella, Medellín and Sabaneta.)	2015	Colombia
15	Curitiba	3,502,804	2015	Brazil
16	Campinas	3,094,181	2015	Brazil
17	Guayaquil	2,952,159 (Note: Population projection is that of the future Metropolitan District of Guayaquil, which will comprise the cantons of Guayaquil proper, Durán and Samborondón.)	2015	Ecuador
18	Cali	2,911,278 (Note: DANE defines the metropolitan area of Cali as comprising the municipalities of Cali, Jamundí, Palmira and Yumbo.)	2015	Colombia
19	Quito	2,653,330 (Note: Population projection is that of Quito proper plus Rumiñahui Canton, which "is clearly within the suburban zone of the city of Quito.")	2015	Ecuador
20	Maracaibo	2,576,836 (Note: The metropolitan area of Maracaibo comprises the municipalities of Jesús Enrique Lossada, La Cañada de Urdaneta, Mara, Maracaibo and San Francisco in the state of Zulia.)	2015	Venezuela
21	Manaus	2,523,819	2015	Brazil
22	Asunción	2,482,760 (Note: The Zona Metropolitana de Asunción (ZOMA) comprises twenty districts, including Asunción proper, fifteen districts in Central Department (all except Guarambaré, Nueva Italia, Villeta and Ypacaraí), and Benjamín Aceval, José Falcón, Nanawa and Villa Hayes districts in Presidente Hayes Department.)	2015	Paraguay
23	Paraíba Valley and North Coast	2,453,387	2015	Brazil
24	Goiânia	2,421,833	2015	Brazil
25	Belém	2,402,438	2015	Brazil
26	Montevideo	2,059,988 (Note: The metropolitan area of Montevideo comprises the departments of Montevideo proper, Canelones and San José.)	2015	Uruguay
27	Barranquilla	2,025,071 (Note: The metropolitan area of Barranquilla comprises the municipalities of Barranquilla, Soledad, Galapa, Puerto Colombia and Malambo.)	2015	Colombia
28	Santa Cruz	1,986,855 (Note: The government of Santa Cruz Department defines the metropolitan area of Santa Cruz as comprising Andrés Ibáñez Province and the municipality of Warnes in Ignacio Warnes Province.)	2015	Bolivia
29	Vitória	1,910,101	2015	Brazil
30	Sorocaba	1,888,073	2015	Brazil
31	La Paz	1,849,504 (Note: A Metropolitan Development Agency for the La Paz area is currently being formed between the five municipalities of Pedro Domingo Murillo Province and the municipalities of Viacha in Ignacio Warnes Province and Laja in Los Andes Province.)	2015	Bolivia
32	Baixada Santista	1,797,500	2015	Brazil
33	Valencia	1,544,004 (Note: The future Metropolitan District of Valencia will comprise the municipalities of Libertador, Los Guayos, Miguel Peña (currently still a parish within the municipality of Valencia), Naguanagua, San Diego and Valencia in the state of Carabobo.)	2015	Venezuela
34	São Luís	1,538,131	2015	Brazil
35	Córdoba	1,519,000 (Note: INDEC defines Greater Córdoba as comprising the city of Córdoba proper plus nineteen localities in Colón Department, Córdoba Province.)	2015	Argentina
36	Natal	1,504,819	2015	Brazil
37	Rosario	1,429,000 (Note: INDEC defines Greater Rosario as comprising the city of Rosario proper plus the localities of Capitán Bermúdez, Fray Luis Beltrán, Funes, Granadero Baigorria, Puerto General San Martín, Pérez, Roldán, San Lorenzo, Soldini and Villa Gobernador Gálvez.)	2015	Argentina
38	Piracicaba	1,412,721	2015	Brazil
39	Norte Catarinense	1,344,089	2015	Brazil
40	Barquisimeto	1,308,163 (Note: The metropolitan area of Barquisimeto comprises the municipalities of Iribarren and Palavecino in the state of Lara.)	2015	Venezuela
41	Maceió	1,304,190	2015	Brazil
42	João Pessoa	1,253,929	2015	Brazil
43	Cochabamba	1,227,044 (Note: Cochabamba's metropolitan area, officially known as the Kanata Metropolitan Region, comprises the municipalities of Cochabamba proper, Quillacollo, Sipe Sipe, Tiquipaya, Vinto, Colcapirhua and Sacaba in Cochabamba Department.)	2015	Bolivia
44	Teresina	1,194,911	2015	Brazil
45	Maracay	1,189,314 (Note: The metropolitan area of Maracay comprises the city of Maracay proper plus the localities of Cagua, El Limón, Palo Negro, San Mateo, Santa Cruz, Santa Rita and Turmero in the state of Aragua.)	2015	Venezuela
46	Cartagena	1,161,320 (Note: The metropolitan area of Cartagena comprises the municipalities of Cartagena, Arjona, Turbaco and Turbana.)	2015	Colombia
47	Florianópolis	1,131,981	2015	Brazil
48	Bucaramanga	1,122,945 (Note: The metropolitan area of Bucaramanga comprises the municipalities of Bucaramanga, Floridablanca, Girón and Piedecuesta.)	2015	Colombia
49	Mendoza	1,082,000 (Note: INDEC defines Greater Mendoza as comprising the city of Mendoza proper plus the localities of Capdeville, Godoy Cruz, Guaymallén, Las Heras, Luján de Cuyo, Maipú, and Papagayos.)	2015	Argentina
50	Londrina	1,076,454	2015	Brazil
