= Ludueña Stream =

River in Argentina

Coordinates: 32°54′23″S 60°40′34″W

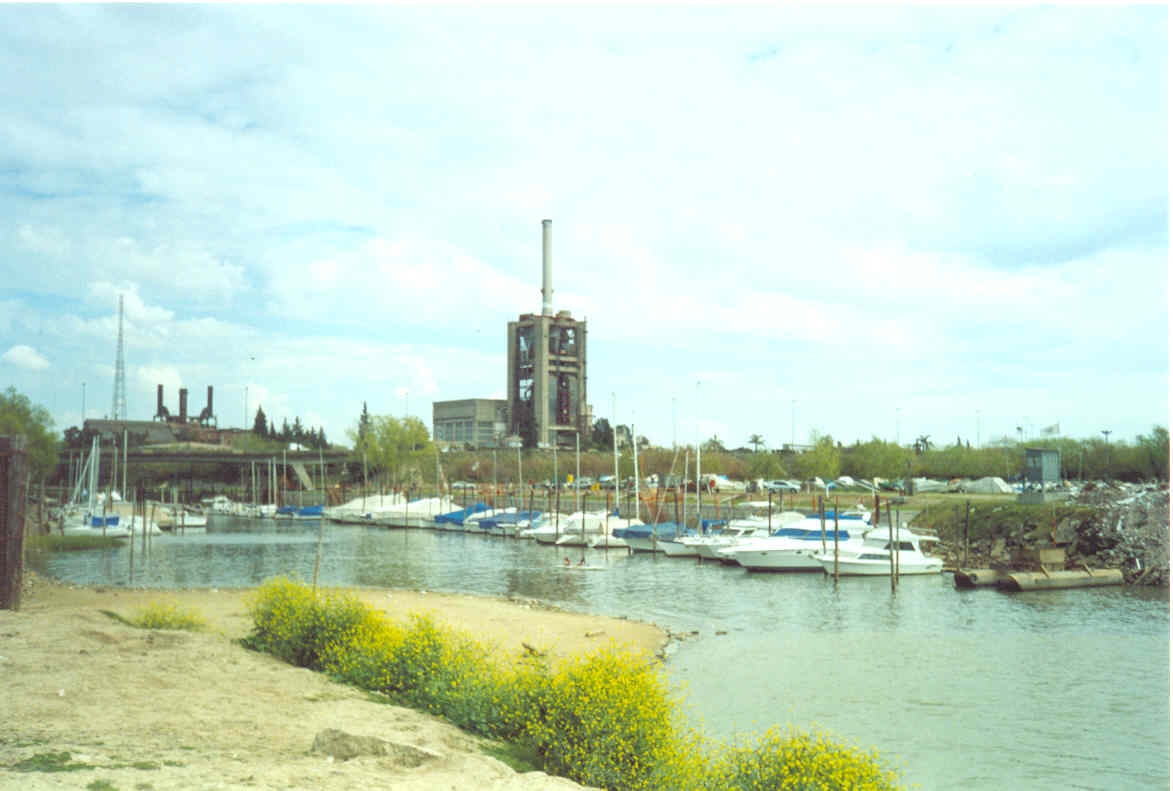
The mouth of the stream

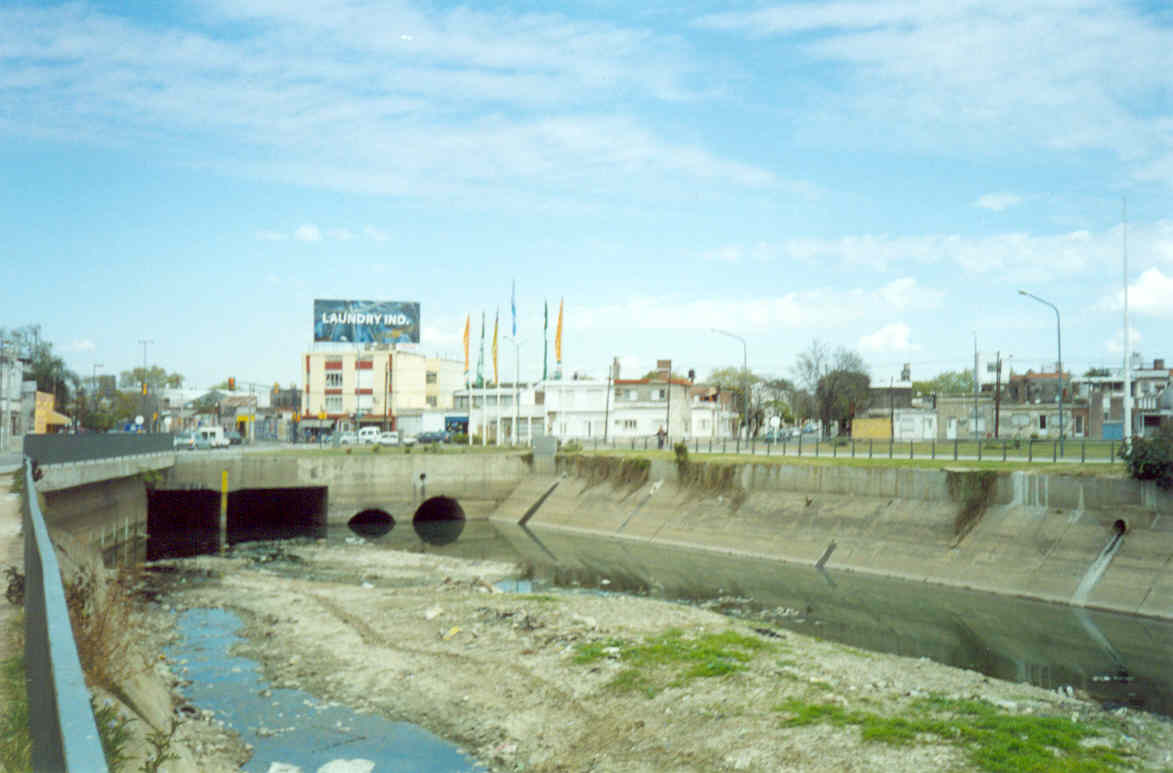
The exit of the underground pipes that carry the stream before emptying into the Paraná River in Rosario

The Ludueña Stream (in Spanish, Arroyo Ludueña) is a small river (about 19 kilometres (12 mi) long including its tributaries) in the province of Santa Fe, Argentina, which starts near the city of Rosario and flows through it, mostly east-southwards, ending in the Paraná River in the neighbourhood commonly known as Arroyito, near Rosario Central's football stadium.

The Ludueña drains an 800 square kilometres (310 sq mi) area which includes Rosario and several smaller towns (Pérez, Zavalla, Pujato, Funes, Roldán, San Jerónimo, Luis Palacios, Ricardone, Ibarlucea, and Camilo Aldao). Parts of its drainage basin are subject to flooding. The last important episode, in 1986, affected several neighbourhoods of the north-east of Rosario (notably the barrios of Ludueña Norte and Empalme Graneros, where water was almost 2 m deep in some points). This flood sparked a grassroots movement to pressure the provincial government to fund preventive measures.

A length of 1.5 km of the Ludueña Stream were piped into five underground closed conduits, with a cross section of 74 m^{2}, which cross densely populated areas and resurface to empty the stream into a final open section a few hundred metres from the Paraná River. In 1995, after two-year works, an earth-fill dam in the upper course of the Ludueña was completed; it is designed as a buffer, to contain and regulate sudden peaks of waterflow, and according to estimates it directly or indirectly benefits about 200,000 people in Rosario and nearby towns.

== March 2007 floods ==
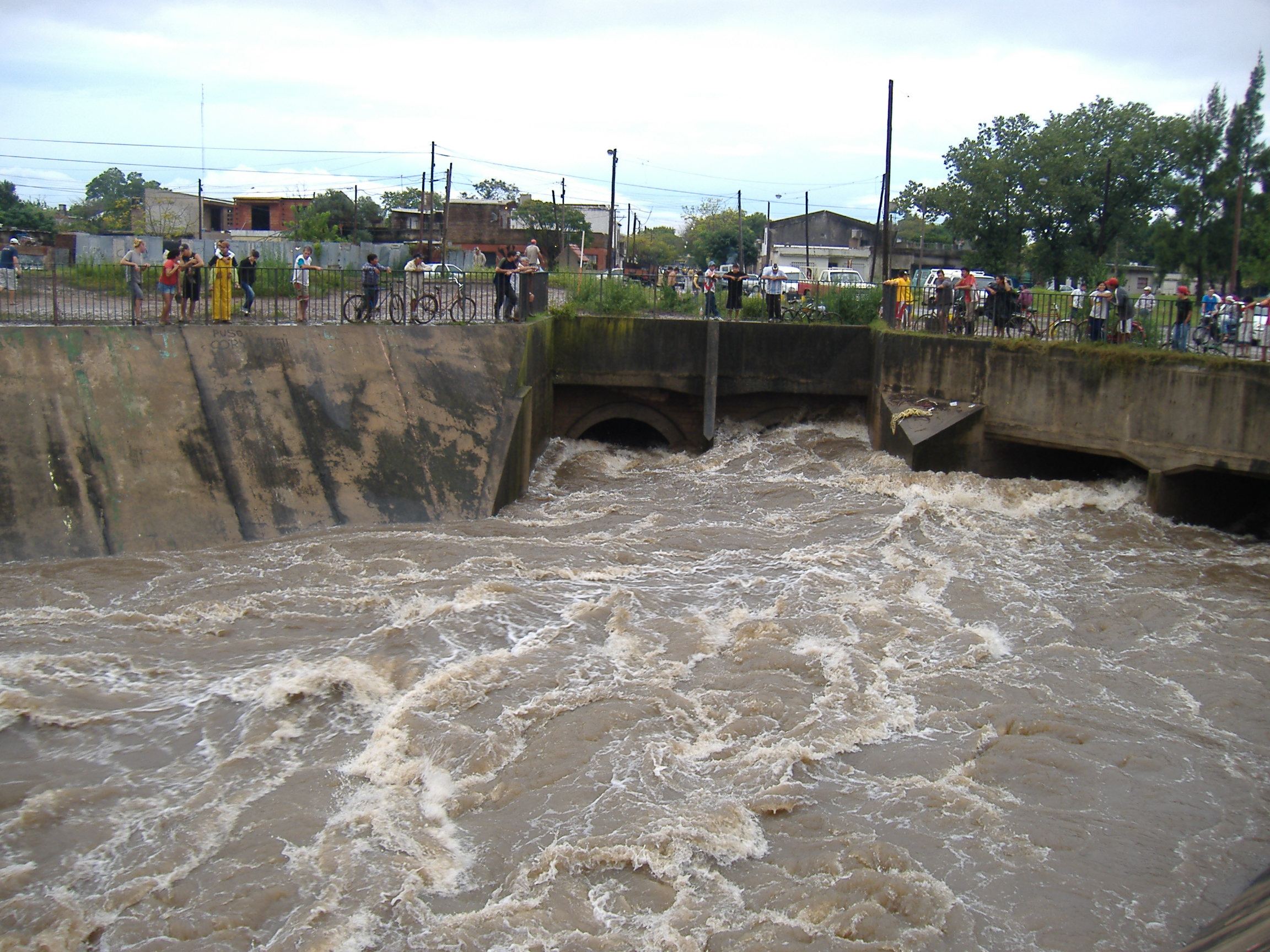
The last section of the stream, before entering the underground pipes, in March 2007

Between the end of March and the beginning of April 2007, more than a week of increased rainfall in a wide area around the Paraná-Plata basin raised the level of the Paraná River and many of its tributaries. The Ibarlucea Canal, which empties into the Ludueña Stream, overflowed and caused the evacuation of several thousand people. The Ludueña Stream did not actually overflow, but brought alarm to the populous neighbourhoods which had suffered from floods in the past.

Some works that were needed to prevent the overflow of the Ibarlucea Canal had not been finished. It was later shown that if they had, the extra flow would have moved into the Ludueña proper and brought it over the brink.

== See also ==
- List of rivers of Argentina

== Sources ==
In Spanish unless otherwise noted.

- JOURNAL OF ENVIRONMENTAL HYDROLOGY. The Electronic Journal of the International Association for Environmental Hydrology. On the World Wide Web at http://www.hydroweb.com. VOLUME 8. 2000. A CELL MODEL FOR HYDROLOGICAL-HYDRAULIC MODELING. Gerardo Riccardi. Consejo de Investigaciones and CURIHAM. Facultad de Ciencias Exactas, Ingeniería y Agrimensura, Universidad Nacional de Rosario, Rosario, Argentina. (English)
- Follow-up report on the national Ministry of Economy website.
- Reclaman fondos para trabajos en la presa del Ludueña - News in La Capital newspaper of Rosario.
- Empalme Graneros, a dieciséis años de la gran inundación. - Report in Barrameda.com.ar, an environmental organization.
