= Leones de Rosario FC =

Leones de Rosario
- Full name: Asociación Civil Leones de Rosario Fútbol Club
- Founded: January 2, 2015; 11 years ago
- Ground: TBD
- Owner: Messi family
- President: Matías Messi
- Manager: Quinteros Daniel
- Coach: Franco Ferlazzo
- League: Primera C
- 2026: TBD
| colours | colours |

Leones de Rosario FC (officially, Asociación Civil Leones de Rosario Fútbol Club) is an Argentine football club based in the city of Alvear, Santa Fe. Founded in 2015 by the Lionel Messi family, it is presided by his older brother Matías Messi.

The club plays in Torneo Unificado de Ascenso B, the second division of Asociación Rosarina de Fútbol, the governing body in Rosario Department. From the 2026 season, Leones will play in Primera C, the fourth division of the Argentine football league system.

Leones is currently managed by Franco Ferlazzo. And the sports manager is Daniel Quinteros.

Apart from president Matías Messi, other family members of the club's executive committee are María Sol Messi (alternate member) and Tomás Matías Messi (auditor).

The club has also a women's football section.

== History ==
The club was established on 2 January 2015 in Alvear, a small city in Rosario Department, Santa Fe Province. That same year the club affiliated to "Asociación Rosarina de Fútbol" (the governing body of football in the Department) and started to compete in "Torneo Unificado de Ascenso". During its first years, the club used the Colegio Sagrado Corazón's sports ground as home venue, then moving to a complex in Alvear that included two football pitches, one with natural grass and the other with artificial turf. The complex also had a smaller pitch, locker rooms, and parking lots.

The team finishing third of zone C in their first year of official competition. The following year Leones played in Primera C (mostly known as "Copa Mariano Reyna"), which won in 2019, promoting to Primera B Rosarina.

Leones gained notoriety in September 2025 after being revealed that the club had been affiliated to the Argentine Football Association to play in Primera C, the fourth division of the regionalised Argentine league system, since 2026.

The decision was controversial because the club was promoted following an invitation by AFA, skipping participation in Torneo Promocional Amateur, the lowest division of Argentina and the necessary step for all teams that affiliate to AFA.

In December 2025, it was revealed that Banco Macro (presided by former president of River Plate Jorge Brito) would be the club's main sponsor, while German sports manufacturer Adidas would be the kits manufacturer.

== Venue ==
The club does not have a stadium that fits to AFA rules for professional competitions so it has been revealed that Club Atlético Unión de Arroyo Seco served as home venue in 2026.
