= Gustavo Cochet =

Argentine artist (1894–1979)

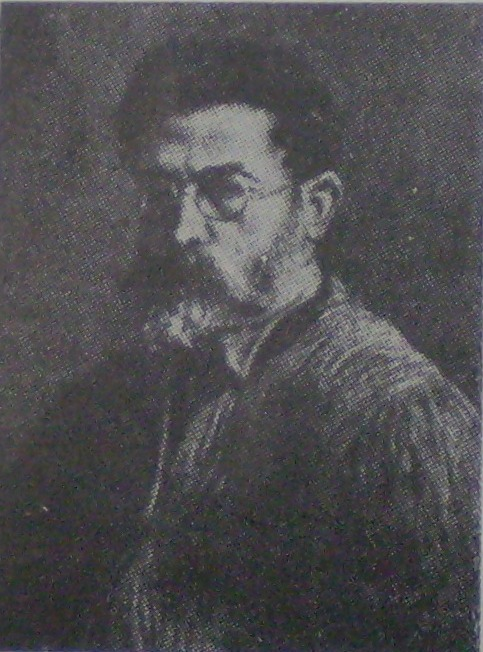
- Gustavo Cochet
- Born: 6 May 1894; Rosario, Argentina
- Died: 27 July 1979 (aged 85); Funes, Santa Fe, Argentina
- Known for: Painter, engraver, and writer

Gustavo Cochet (6 May 1894 – 27 July 1979) was a painter, engraver, and writer who worked in Barcelona and Rosario.

== Biography ==
Cochet was born in Rosario, Argentina, in 1894. His mother was of mestizo heritage, and his father was French, a teacher in a rural elementary school located between Esperanza and San Jerónimo Norte, in the province of Santa Fe, Argentina. Cochet spent his first years in elementary school in the countryside, and his father was then transferred to Carlos Pellegrini and then to Maciel, both small towns in Santa Fe. In Maciel, Cochet began to work an apprentice telegraphist, and in 1912 he moved to Rosario to dedicate himself to painting while working as a telegraphist in the postal office. He studied with the painter César Caggiano, and met other contemporary painters in Buenos Aires. In 1915, he traveled to Barcelona, and by 1917 he had been strongly influenced by the prevailing vanguard movement in art.

Cochet was given his first personal exhibition at the Galeries Dalmau in Barcelona, in 1919. He relocated to Paris the following year, where he met and married Francisca Alfonso. He enlisted in the French Army for a year in 1921, after which his first son was born. At his first Paris exhibition in 1923, he first gained acclaim among local art critics, and became a regular contributor to the city's many art galleries and festivals. Cochet became more politically involved afterwards, and from 1935 participated in the Iberian Anarchist Federation, speaking and reflecting on the rights of artists in what he considered an era of revolution.

He returned to Argentina in 1939, and was named Professor of Painting at a new school in the city of Santa Fe, where he lived and taught until 1946. That year, he published Entre el llano y la sierra (Between the flatlands and the mountains). He died in Funes, Santa Fe, in 1979.

== Museum ==
His children, neighbors, friends, and others have worked to build a museum in his honor, now standing in Funes.

== Bibliography ==
- Florio, Sabina (2011). "Cerca de la vida y del sentir del pueblo. Gustavo Cochet (1894-1979)". Avances del Cesor (in Spanish) (8): 9–29. doi:10.35305/ac.v8i08.831. hdl:2133/12660. ISSN 2422-6580.
- Karp Lugo, Laura (2011). "Los Caprichos de Gustavo Cochet, memorias de la Guerra Civil". Amnis (in Spanish). 2 (2). doi:10.4000/amnis.1506. ISSN 1764-7193.
- Prece, María Eugenia (2006). "Cochet Contemporáneo" [Contemporary Cochet] (PDF). El Libertario (in Spanish). 21 (63): 3.
- Prece, María Eugenia; Cochet, Silvia (2016). "Los Caprichos. Crónicas de una guerra, de Gustavo Cochet, y Los caprichos de Cochet. La obra escondida". Caracol (in Spanish) (11): 268–283. doi:10.11606/issn.2317-9651.v0i11p268-283. ISSN 2317-9651.
