= Piñero (Santa Fe) =

- Interactive map of Piñero
- Coordinates: 33°06′00″S 60°48′00″W
- Country: Argentina
- Province: Santa Fe
- Department: Rosario
- Established: 1903
- Founder: Erasto Piñero Pacheco

Government
  - Presidente comunal: Walter Omar Carenzo (PJ)
- Elevation: 36 m (118 ft)

Population (2001 census [INDEC])
  - Total: 1,128
- Time zone: ART
- Postal code: 2119
- Dialing code: 03402

Piñero is a town in the Rosario Department, province of Santa Fe, Argentina, 14 km southeast of the city of Rosario and 183 km from the city of Santa Fe. It is found along Provincial Road RP 14 on kilometre 13.5 and on kilometre 15 of National Route A012.

RN A012 and Piñero on kilometre 15.

== Geography ==
=== Relief ===
The general relief is very gently undulating due to the lower basin of the Ludueña Stream, which drains into the Paraná River. The drainage network is organized in most of the area but with slightly weathered channels and no signs of significant erosion. There are shallow, extensive and salinized depressions on the western bank.

=== Climate ===
The average annual temperature is 17.1 °C with average annual rainfall of about 1,100 mm, 70% of which is concentrated between October and March (hot season).

=== Soil ===
The zonal soils are typical Argiudolls (in the fine loamy family) which is fine to moderately well drained. The topsoil is silt-loam in texture, with very low sand content. It has well-defined, thick argillic horizons, hindering the penetration of roots and the distribution and use of water. Natural fertility is moderate. Some of these soils were previously classified as vertic Argiudolls but there is no evidence of the cracking required by the taxonomic system for the vertic subgroup.

Depression areas contain mainly poorly drained sodic and sometimes saline soils.
