= Diana Bellessi =

Argentine poet

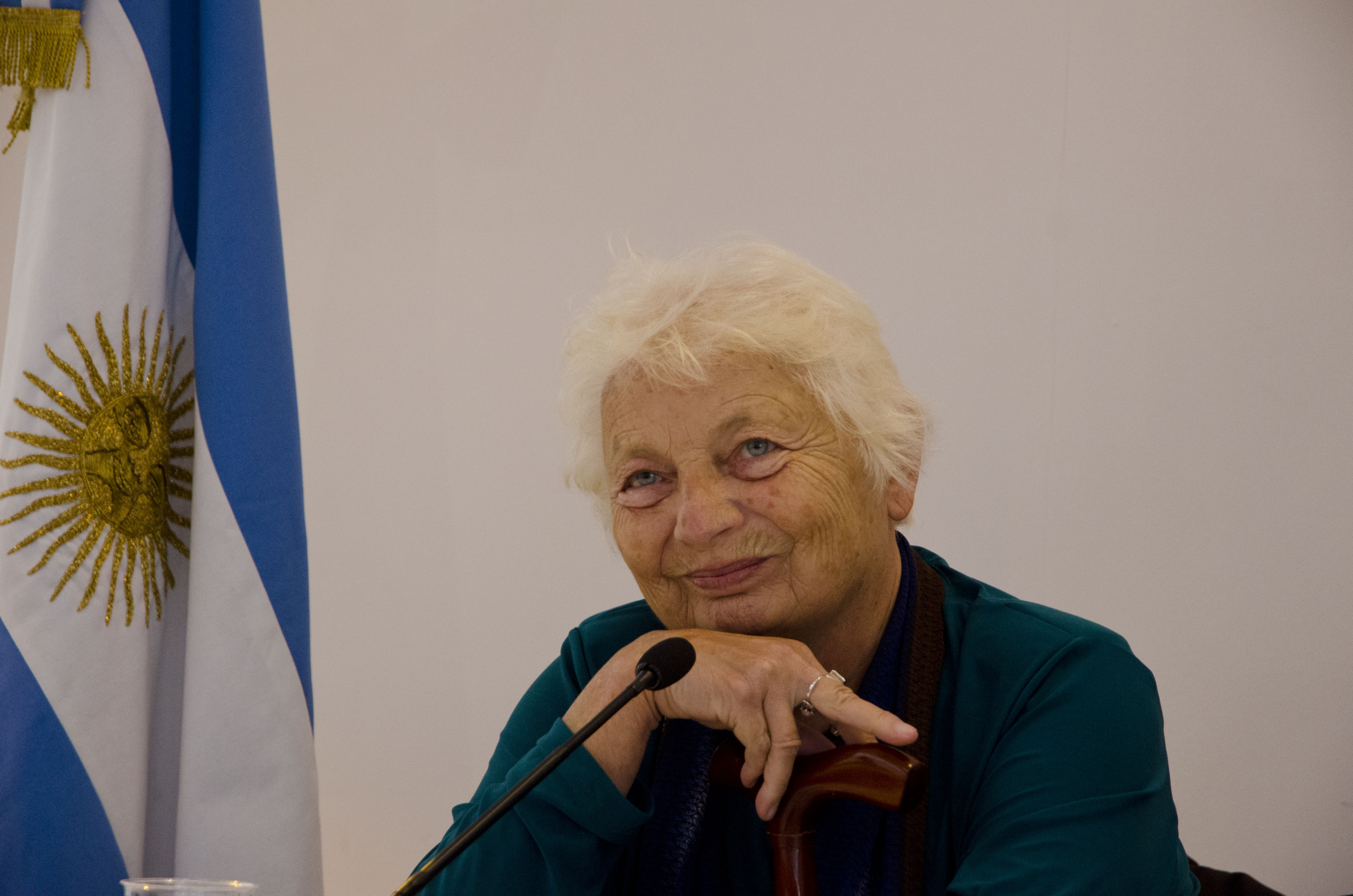
- Diana Bellesi in 2013
- Born: 1946 (age 79–80); Zavalla, Santa Fe, Argentina
- Education: Universidad Nacional del Litoral
- Known for: poetry

Diana Bellessi (born 1946) is an Argentine poet.

== Life ==
Diana Bellessi was born in 1946, in Zavalla, Santa Fe, Argentina. She studied philosophy at the Universidad Nacional del Litoral. From 1969 to 1975, she walked the continent.

For two years, she coordinated writing workshops in prisons in Buenos Aires. She embodied this experience in the book Contraband Paloma (Torres Aguero, Buenos Aires, 1988).

In March 2008, she participated in the Fourth International Festival of İzmir, dedicated to Latin America, with Sergio Badilla Castillo, María Baranda, Rei Berroa, Rafael Courtoisie, Pablo Armando Fernández, and Margarita Laso.

She lives in Buenos Aires.

== Awards ==
- 1993 Guggenheim Fellowship in poetry
- 1996 Antorchas Foundation fellowship
- 2004 Premio Konex, Merit Award
- 2007 Fondo Nacional de las Artes, lifetime award in poetry

== Works ==
- Destino y propagaciones, Edit. Casa de la Cultura Ecuatoriana, Núcleo del Guayas, 1972
- Crucero ecuatorial, Ediciones Sirirí, 1980
- Tributo del mudo, Ediciones Sirirí, 1982
- Danzante de doble máscara, 1985
- Eroica, Libros de Tierra Firme/Ediciones Ultimo Reino, 1988
- Buena travesía, buena ventura pequeña Uli, 1991
- El Jardín, Bajo la Luna Nueva, 1992, ISBN 9789879930205
- Crucero Ecuatorial / Tributo del Mudo, 1994
- The Twins, the Dream (with Ursula K. Le Guin), Arte Publico Press, 1996, ISBN 978-1-55885-179-5
- Sur, Libros de Tierra Firme, 1998
- Gemelas del sueño (con U.K. Le Guin), 1998
- Mate cocido, Grupo Editor Latinoamericano, 2002, ISBN 978-950-694-674-6
- La Edad Dorada, Adriana Hidalgo Editora, 2003, ISBN 978-987-9396-88-9
- La rebelión del Instante, Adriana Hidalgo Editora, 2005, ISBN 978-987-1156-33-7
- Variaciones de la luz, Bajo la Luna, 2006, ISBN 978-987-9108-21-5
- Tener lo que se tiene - Poesía reunida, 2009
- "Gender and Translation", Voice-overs: translation and Latin American literature, Editors Daniel Balderston, Marcy E. Schwartz, SUNY Press, 2002, ISBN 978-0-7914-5529-6
- Las Malas lenguas: antología del cancionero tradicional picaresco, Editors Diana Bellessi, Noemí Diez, Ediciones Del Sol, 1992, ISBN 978-950-9413-41-2
- A palavra nômade: poesia argentina dos anos 70, Editor Santiago Kovadloff, Iluminuras Ltda, 1990, ISBN 978-85-85219-25-3

== Sources ==
- "Un lugar celebratario para la escritura: Diana Bellessi", La doble voz, Alicia Genovese, Editorial Biblos, 1998, ISBN 978-950-786-196-3
