= San Martín de Porres Parish (Aragua) =

San Martín de Porres
- Parish
- Location in Venezuela
- Coordinates: 10°10′16″N 67°34′35″W
- Country: Venezuela
- State: Aragua
- Municipality: Libertador

Population (2006)
  - Total: 130,270
- Postal code: 2117
- Area code: 243

San Martín de Porres Parish is a Venezuelan administrative political division, located in Libertador Municipality, Aragua State, Venezuela and has an approximate population of 130,270 inhabitants. It covers almost 56% of the municipality.

The San Martín de Porres Parish limits to the north with the Santa Rita Parish, to the east with the Palo Negro parish, to the south with the Palo Negro Crossroads, and to the west with the Lake of Valencia.

The Parish includes: the old Palo Negro-Santa Rita Highway (Aragua), El Libertador Air Base, El Libertador Air Base Urbanization (BAEL), Los Aviadores Socialist City Urbanization, José Antonio Vargas Hospital (La Ovallera Social Security) and La Ovallera Urbanization.
