= Zavalla =

Zavalla may refer to:

- Zavalla, Santa Fe, Argentina
- Zavalla, Texas, United States
