= Ernesto Álvarez =

Argentine and Chilean footballer (1928–2010)

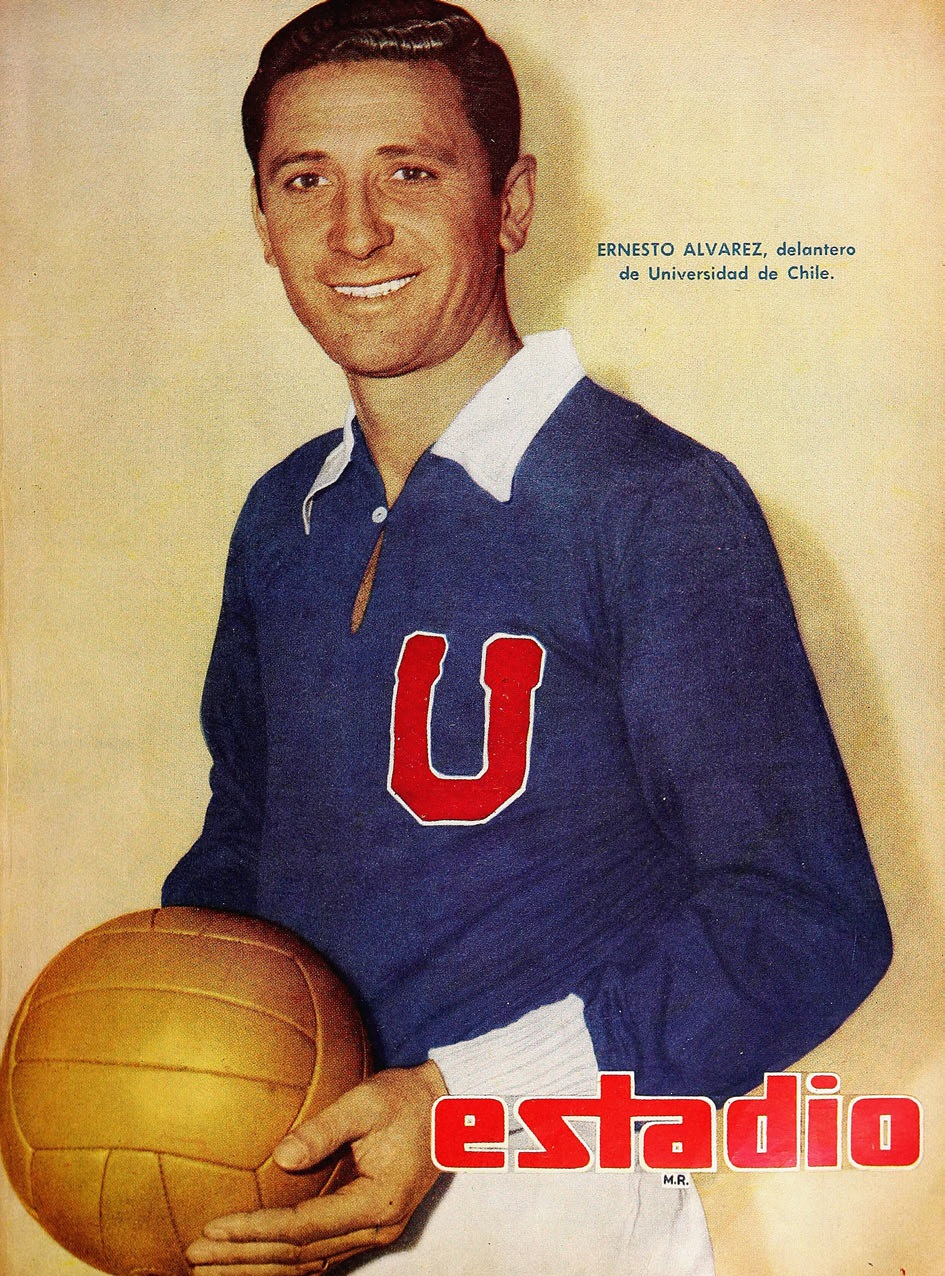

Personal information
- Full name: Ernesto Bernardo Álvarez Terojín
- Date of birth: August 10, 1928
- Place of birth: Fuentes, Argentina
- Date of death: September 27, 2010 (aged 82)
- Place of death: Buenos Aires, Argentina
- Position: Striker

Youth career
- América de Funtes
- Rosario Central

Senior career*
Years	Team	Apps	(Gls)
1948–1956	Banfield	152	(56)
1957–1958	Green Cross		
1959–1965	Universidad de Chile	190	(71)
1966	Green Cross Temuco		
1967	Audax Italiano		

International career
1963	Chile	1	(0)
- * Club domestic league appearances and goals as of November 2008

Ernesto Bernardo Álvarez Terojín (August 10, 1928 in Fuentes – September 27, 2010 in Buenos Aires) was a professional footballer who played as a striker. He played club football in Argentina and Chile.

Álvarez played youth football for América de Funtes and Rosario Central before joining Banfield in 1948. He went on to make 152 appearances for the club, scoring 56 goals.

In 1957 he moved to Chile toplay for Green Cross and in 1959 he joined Universidad de Chile where he became an important member of the team that became known as the "Ballet Azul" (Blue Ballet). He won four league championship titles with the club and is still one of the top scoring players in the history of the club with 82 goals in 190 games.

In 1963 he gained Chilean citizenship and played one game for the Chile national team against Uruguay in the "Copa Juan Pinto Durán".

Álvarez left "La U" in 1965 and returned to Green Cross, who had changed their name to Green Cross Temuco, he played his final season in 1967 for Audax Italiano.

== Honours ==
=== Club ===
- Universidad de Chile
  - Primera División de Chile: 1959, 1962, 1964 and 1965
