= Libertador Municipality =

Libertador Municipality may refer to the following places in Venezuela:

- Libertador Bolivarian Municipality, in the Venezuelan Capital District
- Libertador Municipality, Aragua
- Libertador Municipality, Carabobo
- Libertador Municipality, Mérida
- Libertador Municipality, Monagas
- Libertador Municipality, Sucre
- Libertador Municipality, Táchira
