= Julián Di Cosmo =

Italian-Argentine footballer (born 1984)

Personal information
- Date of birth: 28 December 1984 (age 41)
- Place of birth: Aldao, Argentina
- Height: 1.81 m (5 ft 11 in)
- Position: Striker

Team information
- Current team: FAS
- Number: 23

Youth career
- 2005–2006: Almirante Brown

Senior career*
Years	Team	Apps	(Gls)
2006–2007	Saluzzo	15	(6)
2007–2008	Igea Virtus	31	(16)
2008–2009	Catania	0	(0)
2008	→ Paganese (loan)	16	(2)
2009	→ Andria BAT (loan)	18	(9)
2009–2010	Colligiana	22	(9)
2010–2011	The Strongest	34	(11)
2011–2012	Angostura	12	(4)
2012–2013	Melgar	41	(11)
2013	Oriente Petrolero	19	(3)
2013–2014	Chaco for Ever	6	(1)
2014–2015	José Gálvez	14	(3)
2015	FAS	15	(5)
- * Club domestic league appearances and goals as of 10 April 2015

Julián Di Cosmo (born 28 December 1984, in Aldao, Santa Fe, Argentina) is an Italian-Argentine association football striker, who currently plays for FAS in the Salvadoran Primera División.

== Club career ==
=== Early career ===
Born in, Aldao, Argentina, Di Cosmo began his career in the youth sector of Almirante Brown in Argentina, before transferring to A.C.S.D. Saluzzo in Italy in the summer of 2006. With Saluzzo, Di Cosmo managed 6 goals in 15 appearances for the fifth-tier Italian side, before being sold to Lega Pro Seconda Divisione outfit Igea Virtus prior to the 2007-08 Lega Pro season. He scored 16 league goals in 31 appearances for the Sicilian outfit, winning the Lega Pro Seconda Divisione Capocannoniere (top scorer) that season for his Girone. His performances were often eye-catching, thus impressing scouts of several Serie A and Serie B teams. He eventually completed a transfer to Calcio Catania of the Serie A.

=== Calcio Catania ===
Di Cosmo officially transferred to Calcio Catania in July 2008, although he was swiftly loaned out to Lega Pro Prima Divisione side, Paganese Calcio. Di Cosmo scored 2 goals in 16 league appearances before being recalled to Catania in January 2009. He returned to the Italian fourth tier, joining Seconda Divisione club A.S. Andria BAT on another loan deal. He managed another 9 goals in 18 league appearances for the Italian side, before returning to Catania once again on 30 June 2009.

=== Colligiana ===
On 31 August 2009, the final day of the Italian summer transfer window, Di Cosmo was sold permanently to Tuscan Lega Pro Seconda Divisione outfit, V.F. Colligiana, without making a single appearance for Catania during his stint with the club. Di Cosmo ironically formed an offensive partnership at Colligiana with former Catania teammate Christian Ianelli, and scored 9 goals in 22 league appearances during the 2009-10 Lega Pro Seconda Divisione season.

=== Return to South America ===
Following the 2009–10 season, Di Cosmo returned to South America, with Bolivian side, The Strongest, where he competed in the Liga de Fútbol Profesional Boliviano, and scored 11 goals in 34 league appearances. After just one season, he transferred out of Bolivia altogether, joining Angostura F.C. of Venezuela in 2011. His move was very short-lived, however, as he transferred to Peruvian outfit, FBC Melgar on 31 December 2011, after just 4 goals and 12 appearances in the Venezuelan Primera División. With Melgar, Di Cosmo earned a starting shirt once again, making 41 league appearances and scoring 11 goals in the process. On 31 December 2012, after just one year in the Peruvian Primera División, Di Cosmo returned to Bolivia with Oriente Petrolero on a free transfer. He has since scored 3 goals in 19 league appearances for his club.

=== FAS ===
Di cosmo joined Salvadoran club C.D. FAS.
