= Theobald, Argentina =

Theobald
- Town
- Location of Theobald in Argentina
- Coordinates: 33°19′00″S 60°19′00″W
- Country: Argentina
- Province: Santa Fe
- Department: Constitución

Population (2010)
  - Total: 529
- Time zone: UTC−3 (ART)
- CPA base: S2919
- Dialing code: +54 3400

Theobald is a small town located in the province of Santa Fe, Argentina. It is located within the Constitución Department near the border between the provinces of Santa Fe and Buenos Aires.

The town is home to 529 inhabitants as of 2010.
