= Constitución Department, Santa Fe =

Constitución Department
- Department
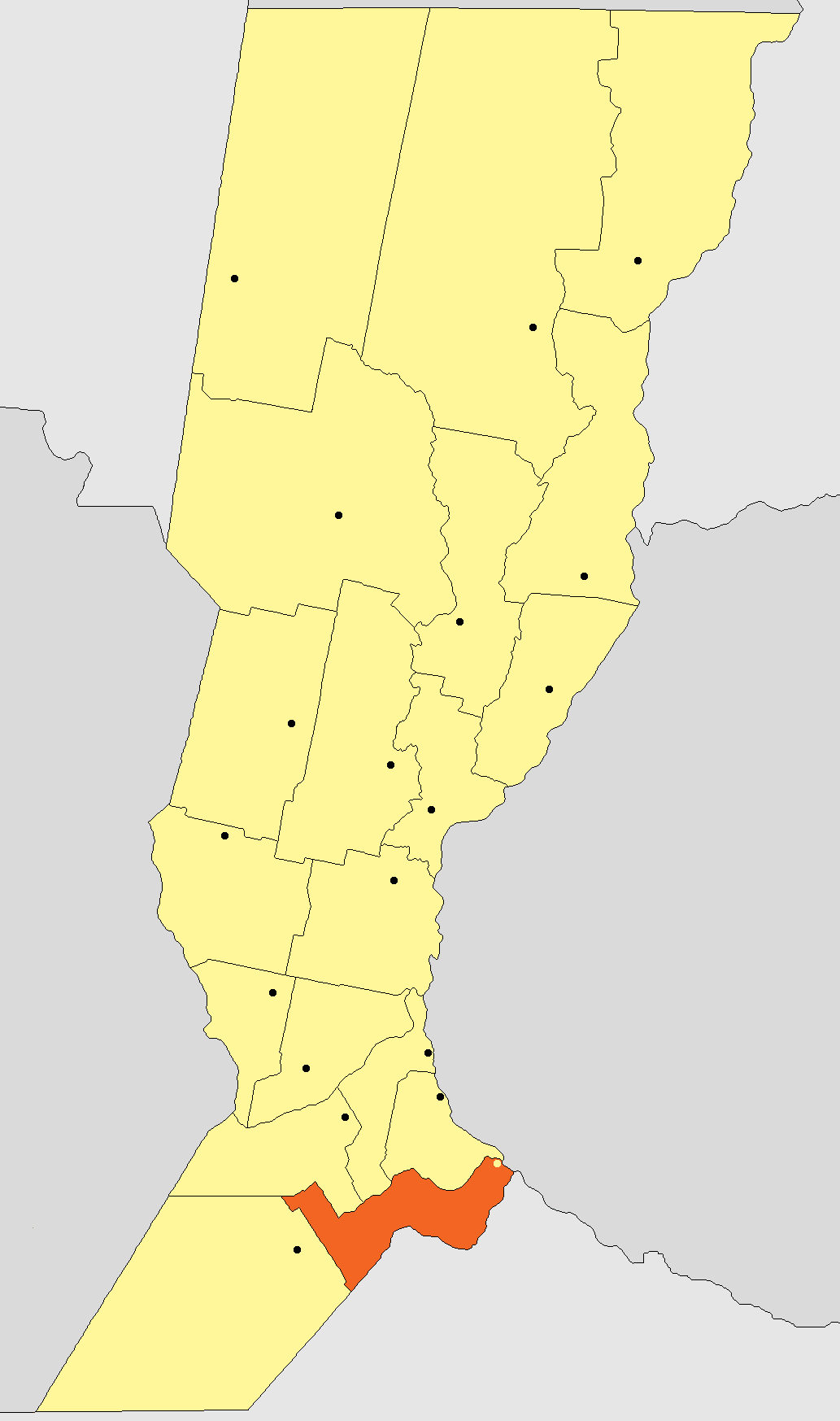
- Location of Constitución Department within Santa Fe Province
- Coordinates: 33°14′S 60°20′W
- Country: Argentina
- Province: Santa Fe
- Head town: Villa Constitución

Area
  - Total: 3,225 km^{2} (1,245 sq mi)

Population
  - Total: 83,045
  - Density: 25.75/km^{2} (66.69/sq mi)
- Time zone: UTC-3 (ART)

The Constitución Department (in Spanish, Departamento Constitución) is an administrative subdivision (departamento) of the province of Santa Fe, Argentina. It is located on the south of the province. It has about 83,000 inhabitants as per the 2001 census [INDEC]. Its head town is the city of Villa Constitución (population 43,000).

Its neighbouring departments are Rosario, San Lorenzo and Caseros in the north, and General López in the west; to the south its natural border is the Arroyo del Medio, which also marks the interprovincial limit with Buenos Aires; to the east it faces the Paraná River, across which is the province of Entre Ríos.

The towns and cities in this department are (in alphabetical order): Alcorta, Bombal, Cañada Rica, Cepeda, Empalme Villa Constitución, General Gelly, Godoy, Juan Bernabé Molina, Juncal, La Vanguardia, Máximo Paz, Pavón, Pavón Arriba, Peyrano, Rueda, Santa Teresa, Sargento Cabral, Theobald, Villa Constitución.
