= Juan Bernabé Molina =

- City
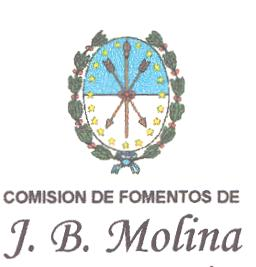
- Coat of arms

- Location of Juan Bernabé Molina in Argentina
- Coordinates: 33°29′37″S 60°30′33″W
- Country: Argentina
- Province: Santa Fe
- Department: Constitución
- Established: November 30, 1908

Area
  - Total: 205 km^{2} (79 sq mi)
- Elevation: 58 m (190 ft)

Population (2010 census)
  - Total: 1,550
  - Density: 7.56/km^{2} (19.6/sq mi)
- Time zone: UTC−3 (ART)
- CPA base: S2203

Juan Bernabé Molina, sometimes shortened to J.B. Molina, is a town located in the Constitución Department in the province of Santa Fe, Argentina. It is located near the border with the Buenos Aires Province.

== Geography ==
Juan Bernabé Molina is located 82 km (51 mi) from the city and provincial capital of Rosario.

== History ==
The town was founded in 1908 by Jorge and Victor Molina after the construction of a rail station by the General Manuel Belgrano Railway, and was named Juan Bernabé Molina in honor of the former's father. A school opened in the town in 1911. The town's early economy was dependent on grain production. The majority of the town's settlers were of Italian and Spanish descent, although many Eastern Europeans also settled in the town. Following the arrest of Juan Perón in 1945, a legend spread among locals that he had been placed in a farm near the town. The creation of an energy cooperative in 1952 led to the town receiving electricity for the first time.

During the COVID-19 pandemic, movement in and out of the community was restricted in order to prevent the spread. María de los Angeles Cervigni, the town's "community president", died of the virus in Rosario in late 2020.

== Economy ==
The town's economy is dependent on agriculture, with the region around Juan Bernabé Molina containing around 16,000 ha (40,000 acres) of land dedicated to soybean production, and 5,000 ha (12,000 acres) for corn. This leaves the town vulnerable to storms, notably a 2024 one which destroyed a large portion of the community's harvest.

== Population ==
Juan Bernabé Molina's population peaked around the 1930s with around 7,000 residents, however this number has since declined significantly to fewer than 2,000.
