= Villa Constitución =

- City
- Location of Villa Constitución in Argentina
- Coordinates: 33°14′S 60°20′W
- Country: Argentina
- Province: Santa Fe
- Department: Constitución
- Founded: February 14, 1858

Government
  - Intendant: Jorge Berti (PJ)

Area
  - Total: 103 km^{2} (40 sq mi)
- Elevation: 42 m (138 ft)

Population (2010 census)
  - Total: 47,374
  - Density: 460/km^{2} (1,190/sq mi)
- Time zone: UTC−3 (ART)
- CPA base: S2919
- Dialing code: +54 3400
- Website: Official website

Villa Constitución is a city in the province of Santa Fe, Argentina, and the head town of the Constitución Department. It is located on the south-western banks of the Paraná River between the courses of the Arroyo Pavón and the Arroyo del Medio, about 214 km south from the provincial capital, the city of Santa Fe, and 50 km from Rosario. It has a population of more than 47,374 inhabitants as per the 2010 census [INDEC].

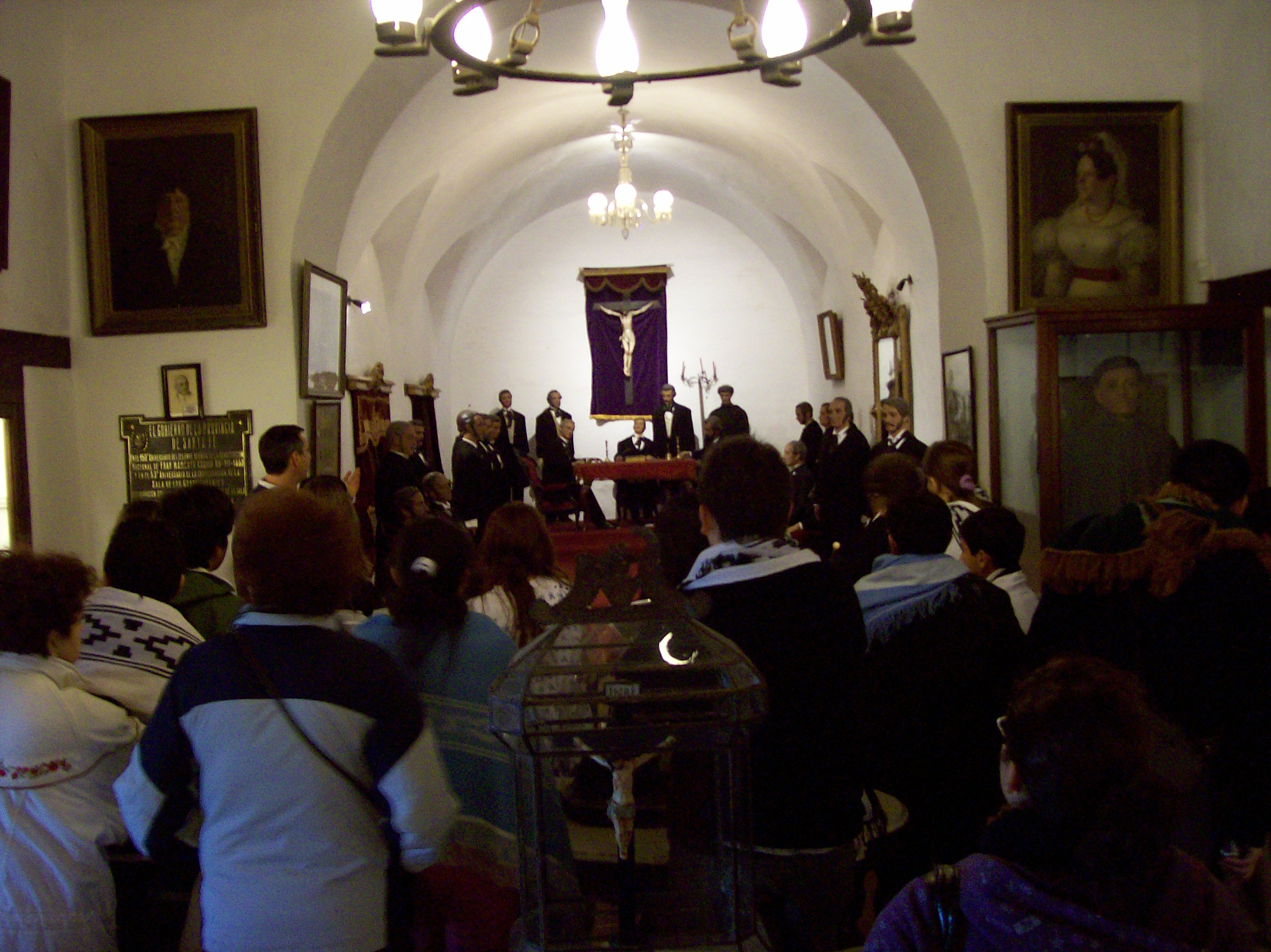
View of Constitution Hall and a reproduction of the 1853 enactment ceremony.

The initial settlement on the shore of the Paraná was called Puerto de Piedras. The town was founded by the initiative of some businessmen from nearby Rosario, after receiving authorization from the government of Santa Fe. The area was strategically important because it was adequate for a port and next to the Arroyo del Medio, which is the natural border with the Buenos Aires Province. The residents of Puerto de Piedras attended the foundation of the new town, with the presence of governor Juan Pablo López, on 14 February 1858. The name Villa Constitución was given to the town to honor the Assembly that had promulgated the Constitution of 1852.

The town started to grow substantially with the arrival of the railroad in 1888–1890 (the station at the junction of the line coming from the port with the Buenos Aires–Rosario railway gave rise to the town of Empalme Villa Constitución). Villa Constitución became an important agricultural center, and then (since the mid-20th century) home for many industrial enterprises.

In the early 60's, in the city had a plant of the Goliath Hansa cars. The Hansa 1100 Lexus are made in Argentina by Goliath Hansa Argentina in the city of Villa Constitución, Santa Fe for the 1960–1961 years in three versions: Sedán de Lujo, Combi y Súper cupé Lujo. With a capital of $3,350,000, began operations on May 2, 1960, and September 15 began work on the construction of a 19,000 m2 manufacturing plant.
