= Tocuyito =

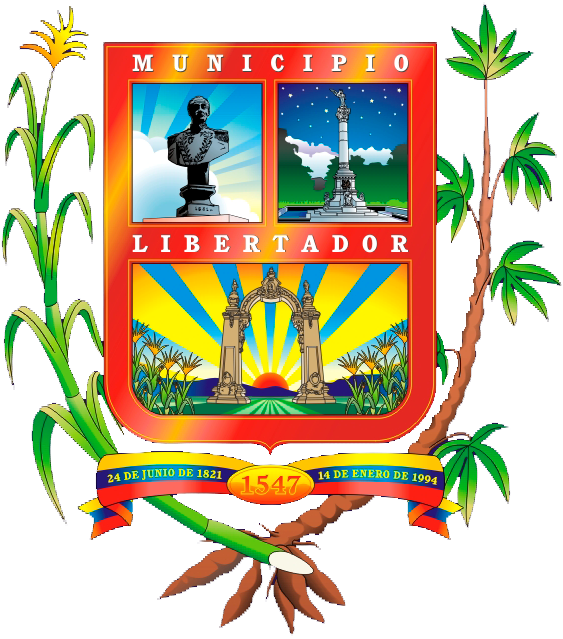
- Coat of arms

- Location in Venezuela
- Coordinates: 10°06′52″N 68°03′56″W
- Country: Venezuela
- State: Carabobo
- Municipality: Libertador
- Founded: 1547
- City Established: May 16, 1782
- Elevation: 340 m (1,120 ft)

Population (2008)
  - Total: 173,450
- Time zone: UTC−4 (VET)
- Climate: Aw
- Website: alcaldialibertador-carabobo.gob.ve

Tocuyito is a city of Venezuela, capital of the Libertador Municipality in Carabobo State. It is part of the metropolitan area of Valencia. This city is considered the entry point to Valencia from the motorways that lead to the Southwest (Barquisimeto) and South (towards Cojedes).

== Geography ==
Tocuyito is located in the flatlands of Carabobo, at an altitude of 451 metres above sea level. Its annual temperature is around 26°C.

== History ==
Tocuyito was founded in 1547 by Spanish Conquistador Juan de Villegas. The name derives from its initial similarity to the town of El Tocuyo (Tocuyito is little Tocuyo). Tocuyo is an Indian word for "yuca juice".

Southwest of the town is where the 1821 Battle of Carabobo took place, resulting in a joint Venezuelan-Colombian victory against the Spanish Army.

There was an important battle in Tocuyito on 14 September 1899, when the so-called Revolution for Liberal Restoration, led by Cipriano Castro, decisively defeated the governmental forces of president Ignacio Andrade.

== Notable locations ==
Tocuyito prison is the largest prison in Venezuela, with over 2,000 prisoners.

== See also ==
- List of cities and towns in Venezuela
