= Villa Amelia, Santa Fe =

Villa Amelia
- Town
- Location of Villa Amelia in Argentina
- Coordinates: 33°11′S 60°40′W
- Country: Argentina
- Province: Santa Fe
- Department: Rosario
- Elevation: 41 m (135 ft)

Population
  - Total: 1,191
- Time zone: UTC−3 (ART)
- CPA base: S2102
- Dialing code: +54 3402

Villa Amelia is a town (comuna) in the province of Santa Fe, Argentina. It has 1,191 inhabitants per the 2001 census [INDEC].
