= Libertador Municipality, Mérida =

Libertador Municipality Municipio Libertador
- Municipality
- Flag Coat of arms

- Location in Mérida

- Location in Venezuela
- Coordinates: 8°36′N 71°09′W
- Country: Venezuela
- State: Mérida
- Municipal seat: Mérida

Government
  - Mayor: Nelson Alvarez (PSUV)

Area
  - Total: 803 km^{2} (310 sq mi)

Population (2007)
  - Total: 232,011
  - Density: 289/km^{2} (748/sq mi)
- Time zone: UTC−4 (VET)
- Area code(s): 0274
- Website: Official website

The Libertador Municipality is one of the 23 municipalities (municipios) that makes up the Venezuelan state of Mérida and, according to a 2007 population estimate by the National Institute of Statistics of Venezuela, the municipality has a population of 232,011. The city of Mérida is the shire town of the Libertador Municipality. The municipality is one of a number in Venezuela named "Libertador Municipality", in honour of Venezuelan independence hero Simón Bolívar.
