= Joaquín Messi =

Argentine footballer

Personal information
- Date of birth: 16 April 2002 (age 24)
- Place of birth: Coronel Arnold, Argentina
- Height: 1.75 m (5 ft 9 in)
- Position: Attacking midfielder

Team information
- Current team: Central Córdoba
- Number: 10

Youth career
- 2022–2024: Newell's Old Boys

Senior career*
| Years | Team | Apps | (Gls) |
| 2023 | Newell's Old Boys | 1 | (0) |
| 2024 | Estudiantes de Río Cuarto | | |
| 2025– | Central Córdoba | | |
- * Club domestic league appearances and goals

Joaquín Silvio Messi (born 16 April 2002) is an Argentine footballer contracted to Central Córdoba who plays as an attacking midfielder.

Nicknamed The Other Messi (Spanish: El Otro Messi), and The New Messi, (Spanish: El Nuevo Messi) he has gained notoriety due to coincidentally having the same surname, being the same nationality, coming from the same hometown, having the same shirt number and starting his professional career at the same club as the world famous Lionel Messi. The two players share no relation.

This coincidence has resulted in an unprecedented amount of interest in the player and pressure, for a player of such calibre.

He debuted in the U-20 Copa Libertadores on 8 February 2022 against Paraguayan club Guaraní.
