= Soldini, Santa Fe =

Soldini
- Town
- Location of Soldini in Argentina
- Coordinates: 33°02′S 60°45′W
- Country: Argentina
- Province: Santa Fe
- Department: Rosario

Government
  - Mayor: Raul Poire (Socialist Party)

Area
  - Total: 76 km^{2} (29 sq mi)

Population
  - Total: 2,771
  - Density: 36/km^{2} (94/sq mi)
- Time zone: UTC−3 (ART)
- CPA base: S2107
- Dialing code: +54 341

Soldini is a town (comuna) in the province of Santa Fe, Argentina. It is part of the Greater Rosario metropolitan area, and lies 179 km south from the provincial capital (Santa Fe).

It has a population of about 2,800 inhabitants (2001 census [INDEC]). The town was founded in 1891 by Domingo Aran, and became officially a comuna on 17 January 1921.
