= Uranga, Santa Fe =

Uranga
- Town
- Location of Uranga in Argentina
- Coordinates: 33°16′S 60°42′W
- Country: Argentina
- Province: Santa Fe
- Department: Rosario
- Elevation: 65 m (213 ft)

Population
  - Total: 957
- Time zone: UTC−3 (ART)
- CPA base: S2112
- Dialing code: +54 3469

Uranga is a small town (comuna) in the province of Santa Fe, Argentina. It has 957 inhabitants per the 2001 census [INDEC].
