= Pavón, Santa Fe =

Pavón
- Town
- Location of Pavón in Argentina
- Coordinates: 33°15′S 60°23′W
- Country: Argentina
- Province: Santa Fe
- Department: Constitución
- Founded: 30 September 1953

Government
  - Communal President: José Antonio López (Justicialist Party)
- Elevation: 30 m (98 ft)

Population
  - Total: 1,492
- Demonym: Pavonense
- Time zone: UTC−3 (ART)
- CPA base: S2918
- Dialing code: +54 3400

Pavón is a town in the Constitución Department, in Santa Fe Province, Argentina. It lies 303 km (188 mi) from the provincial capital, and 43 km (27 mi) from the city of Rosario, near the Rosario-Buenos Aires Highway.

== Schools ==
- "Unidad Nacional", 222 pupils
- Center for Adult learning 223 ("Centro Alfabetizador 223"), 17 pupils

== Sports ==
- Club Atlético Benjamín Matienzo
- Club Atlético Pavón
- Club Alumni

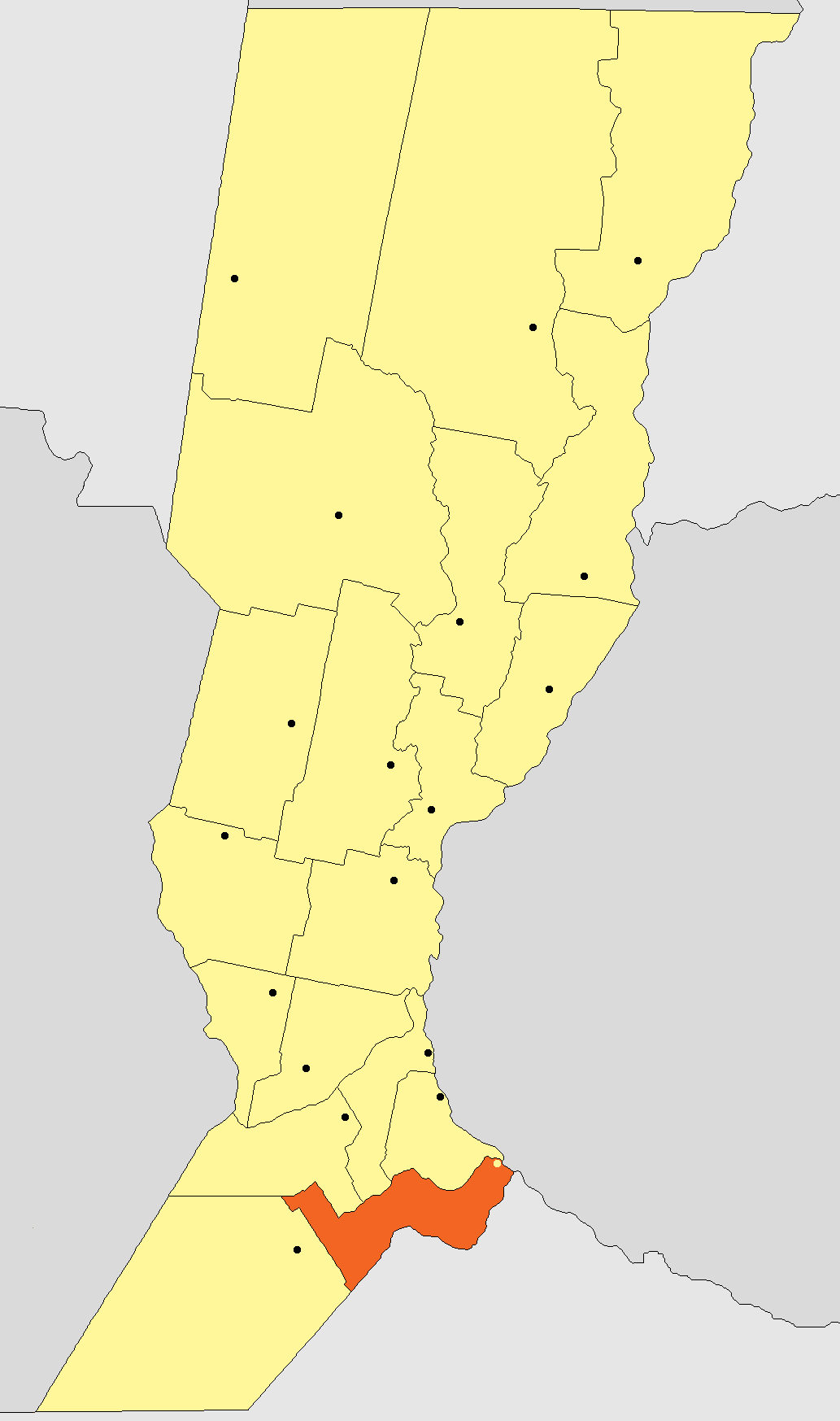

== See also ==
- Battle of Pavón
