= Timbúes =

- Town
- Location of Timbúes in Argentina
- Coordinates: 32°40′S 60°48′W
- Country: Argentina
- Province: Santa Fe
- Department: San Lorenzo

Area
  - Total: 185 km^{2} (71 sq mi)

Population
  - Total: 3,325
  - Density: 18.0/km^{2} (46.5/sq mi)
- Time zone: UTC−3 (ART)
- CPA base: S2204
- Dialing code: +54 3476

Timbúes is a town (comuna) in the province of Santa Fe, Argentina. It has 3,325 inhabitants as per the 2001 census [INDEC]. It lies in the south of the province, at the confluence of the Paraná River and the Carcarañá River, 30 km north of Rosario and 144 km south of the provincial capital Santa Fe, on National Route 11.

Timbúes started as an agricultural colony in lands purchased by Camilo Aldao and former provincial governor José María Cullen, in 1868. Its name was Colonia Jesús María. The settlement was officially acknowledged on 15 July 1871, and the first local authorities were elected on 2 September 1874. In 1892, the Ferrocarril General Manuel Belgrano railway reached the colony, and the station received the name of Timbúes, which in time became the name of the town itself in popular use, though it was officially changed only in 1974. The Timbúes were an Indigenous tribe that formerly populated the area.

The town is located at the northern end of the Industrial Corridor, an area with a great concentration of heavy and medium industries, as well as many important ports, that is centered in Rosario and reaches up to San Nicolás de los Arroyos.

In 2006, contracts were signed to build a thermal power plant in Timbúes. The San Martín Thermoelectric Central, which will be built by Siemens AG, is slated to cost 570 million USD and will be generating 555 MW by May 2008 and 824 MW by April 2009.

Gestion Amaro Fito Gonzales.
