= Empalme Villa Constitución =

- Town
- Location of Empalme Villa Constitución in Argentina
- Coordinates: 33°16′S 60°23′W
- Country: Argentina
- Province: Santa Fe
- Department: Constitución

Population
  - Total: 5,890
- Time zone: UTC−3 (ART)
- CPA base: S2918
- Dialing code: +54 3400

Empalme Villa Constitución (often shortened to Empalme) is a town (comuna) in the south of the province of Santa Fe, Argentina. It has 5,890 inhabitants as per the 2001 census [INDEC].

== Overview ==
Empalme lies 5 km (3 mi) from the city of Villa Constitución and 45 km (28 mi) south of Rosario. Its name, which means junction in Spanish, alludes to its location at the junction of the main Buenos Aires–Rosario railway and a short line coming from the port of Villa Constitución, which was opened in 1886.
