= Alvear, Santa Fe =

Alvear
- Village
- Location within Argentina
- Coordinates: 33°4′00″S 60°37′00″W
- Country: Argentina
- Province: Santa Fe
- Department: Rosario
- Established: 1911
- Elevation: 28 m (92 ft)

Population (2010 Census)
  - Total: 4,451
- Time zone: UTC−3 (ART)
- CPA Base: S 2130
- Area code: +54 3497
- Climate: Cfa

Alvear is a village in Argentina, located in the Rosario Department of Santa Fe Province.
