= Coronel Arnold, Santa Fe =

Coronel Arnold
- Town
- Location of Coronel Arnold in Argentina
- Coordinates: 33°6′S 60°58′W
- Country: Argentina
- Province: Santa Fe
- Department: San Lorenzo

Population
  - Total: 929
- Time zone: UTC−3 (ART)
- CPA base: S2131
- Dialing code: +54 341

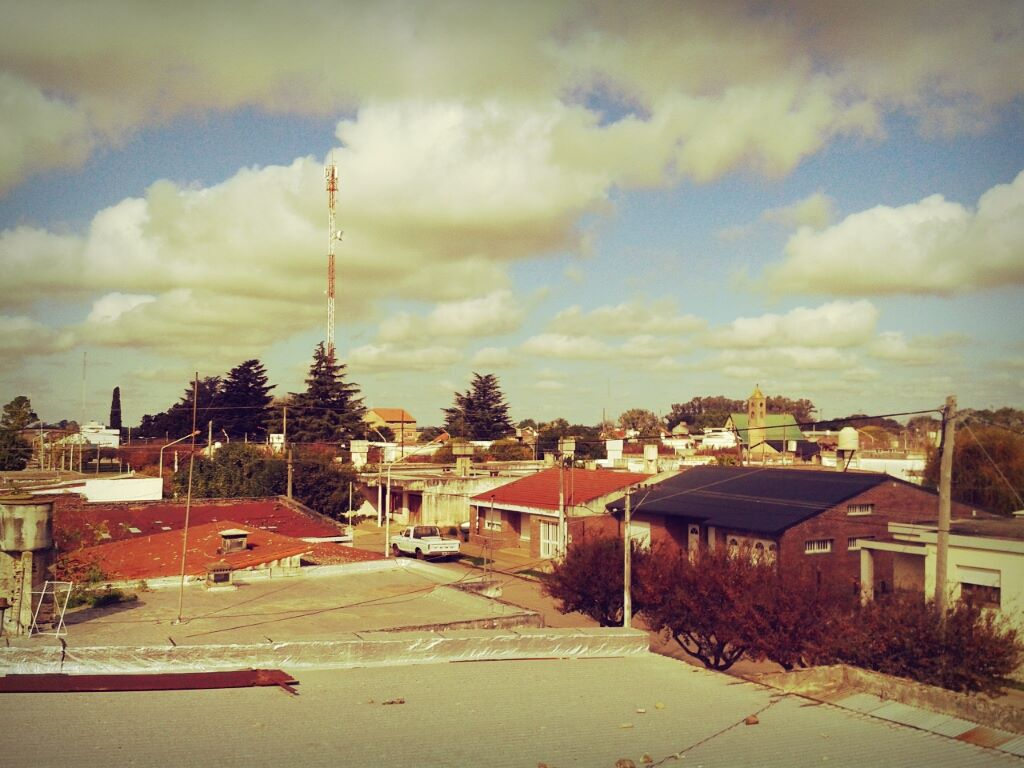
Coronel Arnold

Coronel Arnold, usually known as Arnold, is a small town (comuna) in the province of Santa Fe, Argentina. It has 929 inhabitants as per the 2001 census [INDEC].

The village has an area of 3 blocks by 10. It is located between the towns of Zavalla and Fuentes.

It is known for its good land for crops and has many ranches.

== Notable people ==
- Joaquín Messi (born 2002), Argentine footballer
