= Funes, Santa Fe =

Funes Villa San José or San José de los Sapos
- City
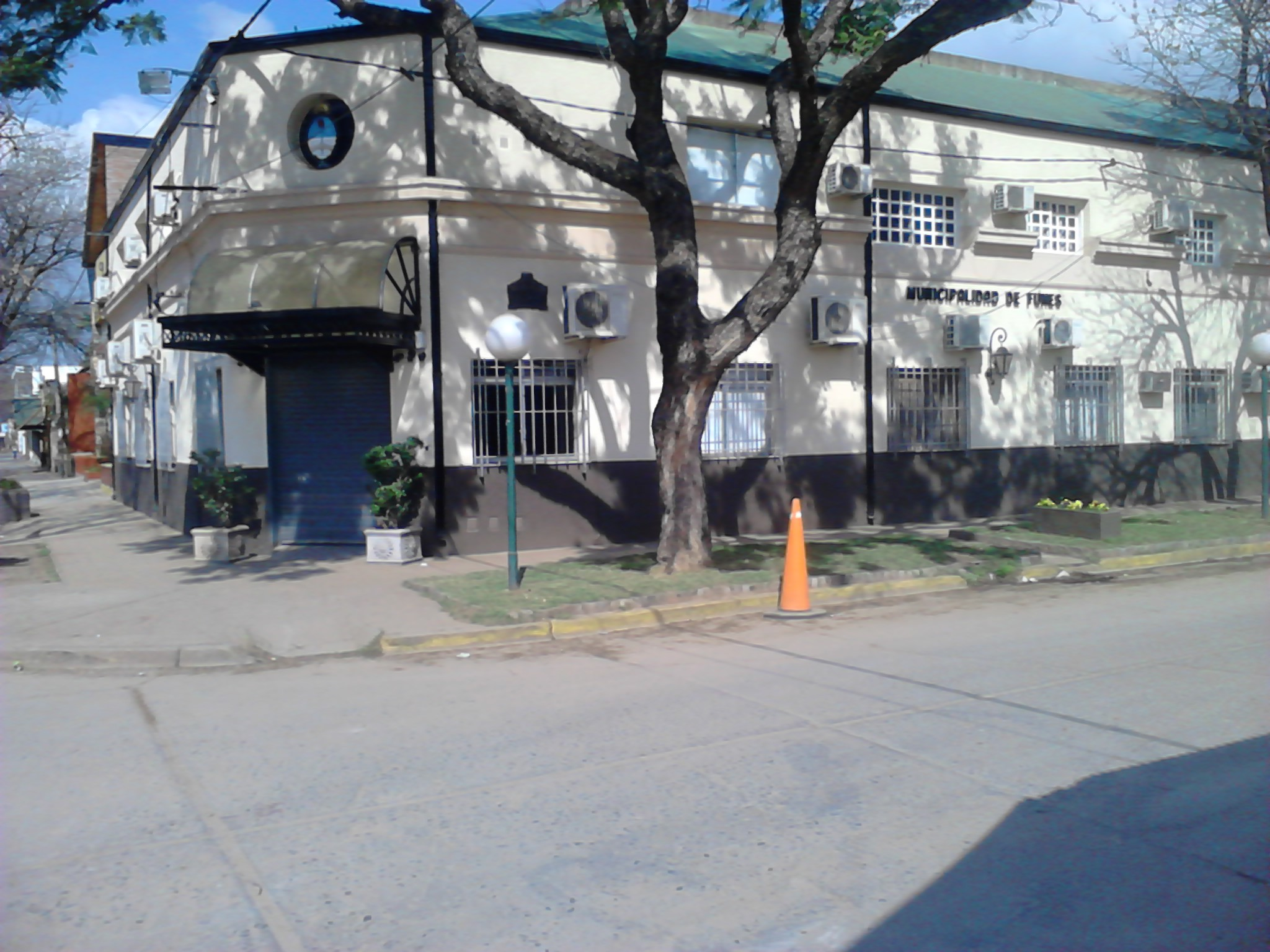
- Nickname: Jardín de la Provincia
- Location of Funes in Argentina
- Coordinates: 32°55′S 60°49′W
- Country: Argentina
- Province: Santa Fe
- Department: Rosario
- Established: 20 August 1875
- Founder: Tomás de la Torre & Modesta Ávila

Government
  - Intendant: Rolvider Antonio Santacrose (Justicialist Party)

Area
  - Total: 100 km^{2} (39 sq mi)
- Elevation: 50 m (160 ft)

Population (2010)
  - Total: 38,274
  - Rank: 5
  - Density: 380/km^{2} (990/sq mi)
- Demonym: Funense
- Time zone: UTC-3 (ART)
- CPA base: S2132
- Dialing code: +54 341
- ISO 3166 code: AR-S
- Website: www.funes.gob.ar

Funes is a small affluent city in the province of Santa Fe, Argentina, located within the metropolitan area of Greater Rosario, about 15 km west from downtown Rosario. It has a population of about 23,500 inhabitants.

Funes was founded by Tomás de la Torre in 1874. At the time, its name was San José. It was also known as Loma de Ávila.

The city has been dubbed "The Garden of the Province". On weekends and during summer vacations, it is popular with visitors, especially from nearby Rosario; local sources estimate the number on 40,000. A large part of the urban infrastructure is devoted to private houses owned or rented by these occasional residents.

== Location ==
The city is located 21 km from downtown Rosario, 170 km from the capital city of Santa Fe, 310 km from Buenos Aires and 400 km from Córdoba.

The city extends east-west for more than 8 km from north to south and about 6 km at its peak. Rosario Bordered to the east, separated by the creek Ludueña, west to the town of Roldán, separated by the street "San Sebastian" with the city north of Ibarlucea and south by the town of Pérez.

The city is bisected by the National Route 9 (continued from Córdoba in Rosario / Av Eva Perón Street), the RP34-S (north to south), Av Arturo Illia (ex Air Force and then street "Av. Mendoza " in Rosario / San José de Calasanz Av.), where the Aeronautical Military Lyceum of Argentina Air Force and AU9 (extension of Avenida Pellegrini in Rosario) is located. Four blocks north of the National Route 9, the municipality is crossed by the line of General Mitre Railway Nuevo Central Argentino.

Bordering the city is Islas Malvinas International Airport, jurisdiction of Rosario. The lands of the airport are partly included in the jurisdiction of Funes.

Funes has undergone a slow transformation during the 2000s and 2010s, going from a minor town on the outskirts of Rosario, to an important bedroom community, where new gated communities have sprung up around the exits on the Rosario - Córdoba interstate highway. This influx of homeowners and professionals from Rosario, Buenos Aires, and other locations has greatly expanded the city income through property taxes and fostered the growth of new services and eateries in the area.

Currently, the "Quinta de Funes" is the only CCD confirmed so far by the justice system, located at the intersection of the former RN9 and diagonal San José. Between September 1977 and January 1978, a clandestine printing press operated there, from which the Army falsified pamphlets of militants of the Montoneros organisation and where the intelligence plan known as "Operation Mexico" was elaborated, by order of General Leopoldo Galtieri, whose objective was to kidnap members of the Montoneros leadership, who were in that country. In 2016, the property was marked as a "Site of Memory of State Terrorism" and expropriation was approved to convert it into a museum.
