= Fuentes, Santa Fe =

Fuentes
- Town
- Location of Fuentes in Argentina
- Coordinates: 33°10′S 61°5′W
- Country: Argentina
- Province: Santa Fe
- Department: San Lorenzo

Population
  - Total: 2,628
- Time zone: UTC−3 (ART)
- CPA base: S2123
- Dialing code: +54 3464

Fuentes is a town (comuna) in the province of Santa Fe, Argentina. It has 2,628 inhabitants as per the 2001 census [INDEC].

== Foundation ==
Founded on 6 April 1888, the day on which the Superior Government of the Province approved the survey plans. Enriqueta Wilson de Olavarría Le Bas, Diego Musgrave and Juan Fuentes are considered its founders for having taken advantage of the provincial law on the foundation of colonies.
