= Zavalla, Santa Fe =

Zavalla
- Town
- Location of Zavalla in Argentina
- Coordinates: 33°1′S 60°53′W
- Country: Argentina
- Province: Santa Fe
- Department: Rosario and San Lorenzo
- Founded: 1887

Government
  - Presidente comunal: Guillermo Rajmil (PJ-FpV)

Area
  - Total: 73 km^{2} (28 sq mi)
- Elevation: 41 m (135 ft)

Population (2010)
  - Total: 5,166
  - Density: 71/km^{2} (180/sq mi)
- Time zone: UTC−3 (ART)
- CPA base: S2123
- Dialing code: +54 341

Zavalla is a town (comuna) in the south of the province of Santa Fe, Argentina. It has 4,659 inhabitants per the 2001 census [INDEC]. It is located on National Route 33, immediately west of Pérez, 22 km southwest of the center of Rosario, and 187 km south of the provincial capital Santa Fe.

The settlement was established around a train station of the Ferrocarril Oeste Santafesino railway company, built in 1883 under the sponsorship of Carlos Casado del Alisal. The town proper was founded in 1887, and the local government institution (a support commission) was formally created on 21 July 1898. Its name is a homage to the priest and politician Manuel María Zavalla.
