= San Lorenzo Department =

- Department
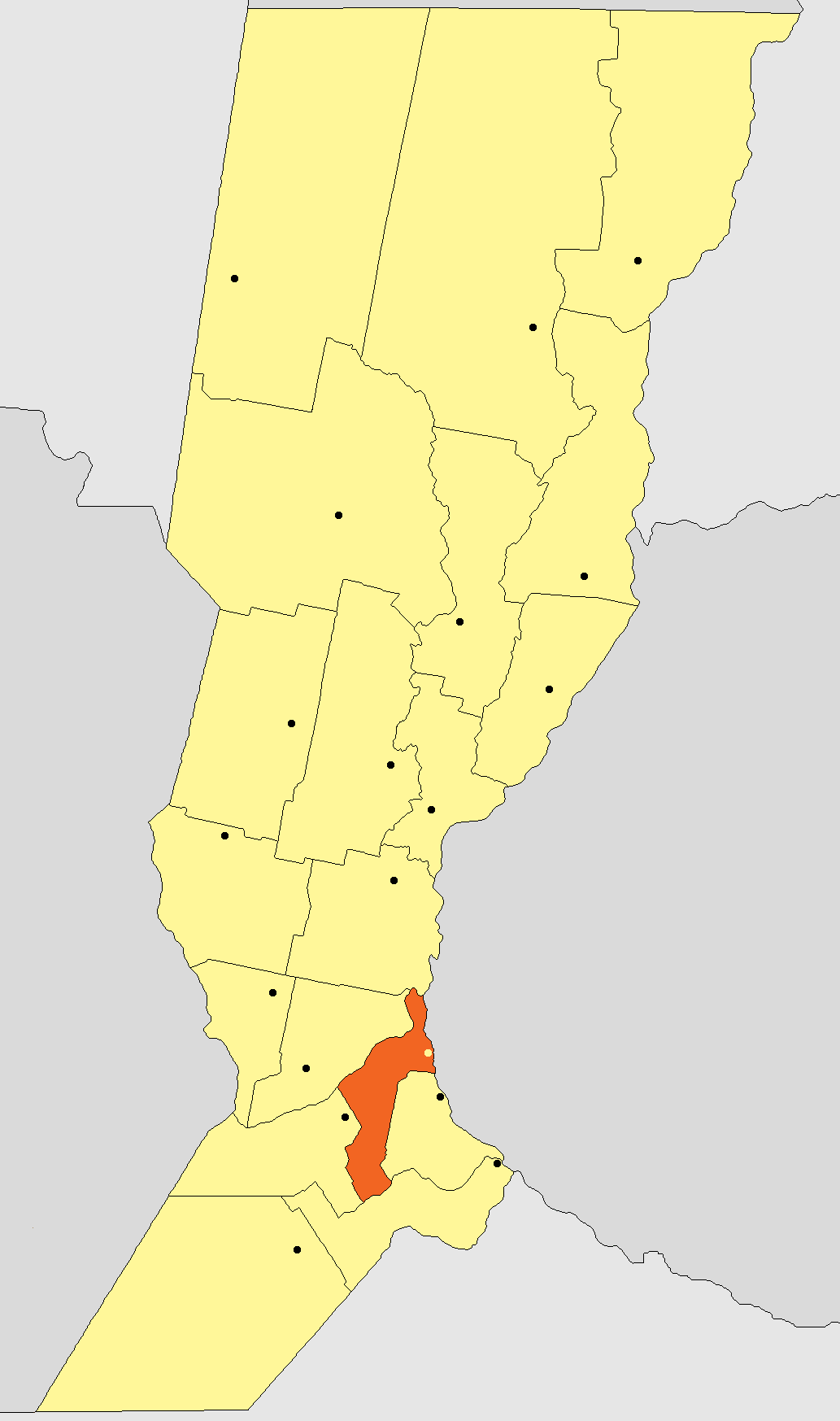
- Location of San Lorenzo Department within Santa Fe Province
- Coordinates: 32°45′S 60°44′W
- Country: Argentina
- Province: Santa Fe
- Head town: San Lorenzo

Area
  - Total: 1,867 km^{2} (721 sq mi)

Population
  - Total: 142,097
  - Density: 76.11/km^{2} (197.1/sq mi)
- Time zone: UTC-3 (ART)

The San Lorenzo Department (in Spanish, Departamento San Lorenzo) is an administrative subdivision (departamento) of Santa Fe Province, Argentina. It is located in the south of the province. It limits with the populous Rosario Department and the Paraná River in the east; and from there (going clockwise) with the departments of Constitución (south), Caseros (east), Iriondo (east and north) and San Jerónimo (north).

The department has an area of 1,867 km^{2} and a population of over 140,000 inhabitants. Its head town and most populated urban center is San Lorenzo (population 43,000). Other cities and towns are Aldao, Capitán Bermúdez, Carcarañá, Coronel Arnold, Fray Luis Beltrán, Fuentes, Luis Palacios, Puerto General San Martín, Pujato, Ricardone, Roldán, San Jerónimo Sud, Timbúes, and Villa Mugueta.

The San Lorenzo Department includes important ports on the Paraná River, such as the city of San Lorenzo itself and Puerto General San Martín (which ships 50% of the Argentine exports of soybean). This area also forms part of the so-called Industrial Corridor that stretches south towards Rosario and reaches up to San Nicolás de los Arroyos.
