= Libertador Municipality, Carabobo =

Libertador Municipality Municipio Libertador
- Municipality
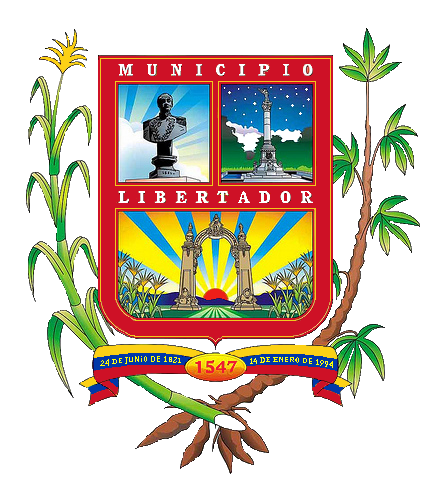
- Flag Coat of arms

- Location in Carabobo

- Location in Venezuela
- Coordinates: 10°03′22″N 68°08′09″W
- Country: Venezuela
- State: Carabobo
- Municipal seat: Tocuyito

Government
  - Mayor: Oscar Orsini Pelgron PSUV

Area
  - Total: 550.0 km^{2} (212.4 sq mi)
- Elevation: 457 m (1,499 ft)

Population (2011)
  - Total: 166,166
  - Density: 302.1/km^{2} (782.5/sq mi)
- Time zone: UTC−4 (VET)
- Area code(s): 0241
- Website: Official website

The Libertador Municipality is one of the 14 municipalities (municipios) that makes up Carabobo State of Venezuela and, according to the 2011 census by the National Institute of Statistics of Venezuela, the municipality has a population of 166,166. The town of Tocuyito is the shire town of the Libertador Municipality. The municipality is one of a number in Venezuela named "Libertador Municipality", in honour of Venezuelan independence hero Simón Bolívar.

== Demographics ==
The Libertador Municipality, according to a 2007 population estimate by the National Institute of Statistics of Venezuela, has a population of 175,255 (up from 149,721 in 2000). This amounts to 7.9% of the state's population The municipality's population density is 314.08 inhabitants per square kilometre (813.5/sq mi).

== Government ==
The mayor of the Libertador Municipality is Carmen Alvarez, elected on November 23, 2008, with 49% of the vote She replaced Argenis Isaias Loreto Puerta shortly after the elections. The municipality is divided into two parishes; Tocuyito and Independencia.
