= Aldao, Santa Fe =

Aldao
- Town
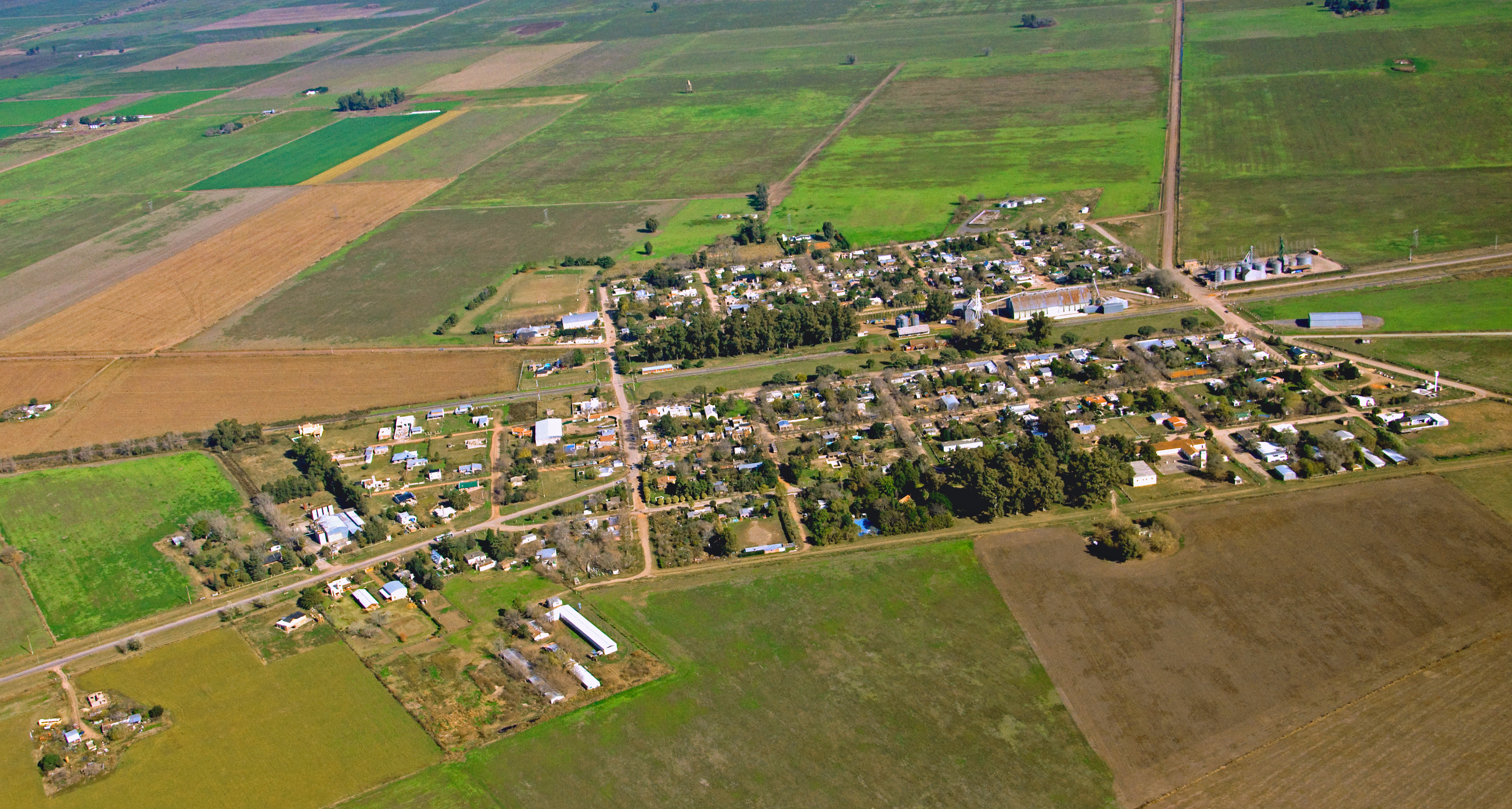
- Aldao in 2010

- Location of Aldao in Argentina
- Coordinates: 32°43′S 60°49′W
- Country: Argentina
- Province: Santa Fe
- Department: San Lorenzo

Population
  - Total: 727
- Time zone: UTC−3 (ART)
- CPA base: S2214
- Dialing code: +54 3476

Aldao is a small town (comuna) in the province of Santa Fe, Argentina located 343 km northwest of Buenos Aires, 139 km from the City of Santa Fe, 16 km northwest of the head of the department of San Lorenzo, and 39 km from Rosario by paved route and by highway.

== History ==
The first inhabitants of this region were the indigenous "Chaná-Timbúes". In the 18th century, the Jesuits installed a mission called "San Miguel", and in 1780 it was acquired by the Franciscans, founding a Convent called "San Carlos", which later moved to the neighboring town of San Lorenzo in 1796. At the end of the 19th century, the Society of Don Camilo Aldao and Don José María Cullen encouraged the arrival of the first immigrants, the majority being Italians, especially from the Molise region. The first houses were built in 1886, at the end of the year the train station was installed. In 1905 the Italian immigrant from the Ligure town of Chiavari, Don Gerónimo Lagomarsino, bought all the lands of the Aldao / Cullen society and decided to make a town, lay out the streets and reserve a space to install a school and another for a public square.

== Population ==
It has 727 inhabitants (2010 census [INDEC]), which represents an increase of 21% compared to the 601 inhabitants (2001) of the previous census.

== Education ==
Aldao has a primary school called Provincial School No. 6019 "Convento San Carlos", which was founded on May 3, 1907, at the initiative of Gerónimo Lagomarsino.

== Institutions ==
The town has various institutions such as the "Aldao Social Club", founded on February 28, 1924, recognized in the region for its leather barbecue dinners, the "San Jerónimo" Church, the "Amistad" Retiree Center and the Library public, communal and popular "Bartolomé Mitre".
