= Capitán Bermúdez =

- City
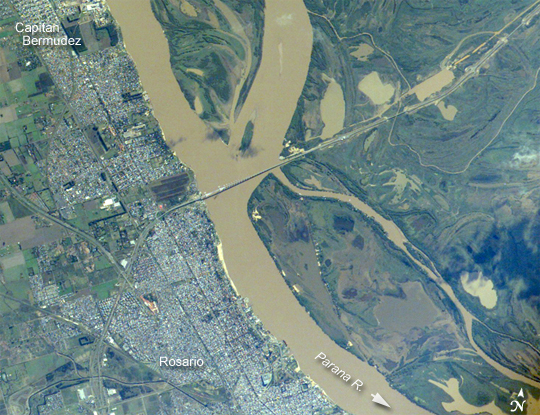
- satellite view of Capitán Bermúdez (north), Rosario and the Paraná River

- Coat of arms

- Location of Capitán Bermúdez in Argentina
- Coordinates: 32°49′S 60°43′W
- Country: Argentina
- Province: Santa Fe
- Department: San Lorenzo

Government
  - Intendant: Daniel Cinalli (PJ)

Area
  - Total: 12 km^{2} (4.6 sq mi)

Population (2010 census)
  - Total: 29,218
  - Density: 2,400/km^{2} (6,300/sq mi)
- Time zone: UTC−3 (ART)
- CPA base: S2154
- Dialing code: +54 341

Capitán Bermúdez is a city in the province of Santa Fe, Argentina, located within the metropolitan area of Greater Rosario, (north of Rosario, immediately north of Granadero Baigorria), on the western shore of the Paraná River. It had a population of about 29,000 inhabitants at the time of the 2010 census [INDEC]. In 1991, fragments of the Soviet Union's Salyut 7 space station showered the town after burning up on re-entry.

== Town ==
The town was founded in 1889, and officially became a city in 1971. Its name is an homage to Justo Bermúdez, a captain of the rebel forces of General José de San Martín during the Battle of San Lorenzo.

The city hosts important industries that make use of environmentally harmful chemicals, including a petrochemical plant and a paper mill. According to studies conducted in the 1990s by Greenpeace, the paper plant (property of Celulosa S. A.) is responsible for contaminating the Paraná River with chlorine-derived chemicals and others (methoxyphenols such as chloro-guaiacol, di- and tri-chloro-phenols, alkylbenzenes, sulfur compounds, long-chain hydrocarbons, and chloroform). Similar charges have been made about the petrochemical plant Electroclor, owned by Imperial Chemical Industries (ICI), which manufactures chlorine.

In 1991, fragments of the Soviet Union's Salyut 7 space station showered the town after burning up on re-entry. It had overshot its intended entry point, which would have placed its debris in uninhabited portions of the southern Pacific Ocean.
