= Rosario Department =

- Department
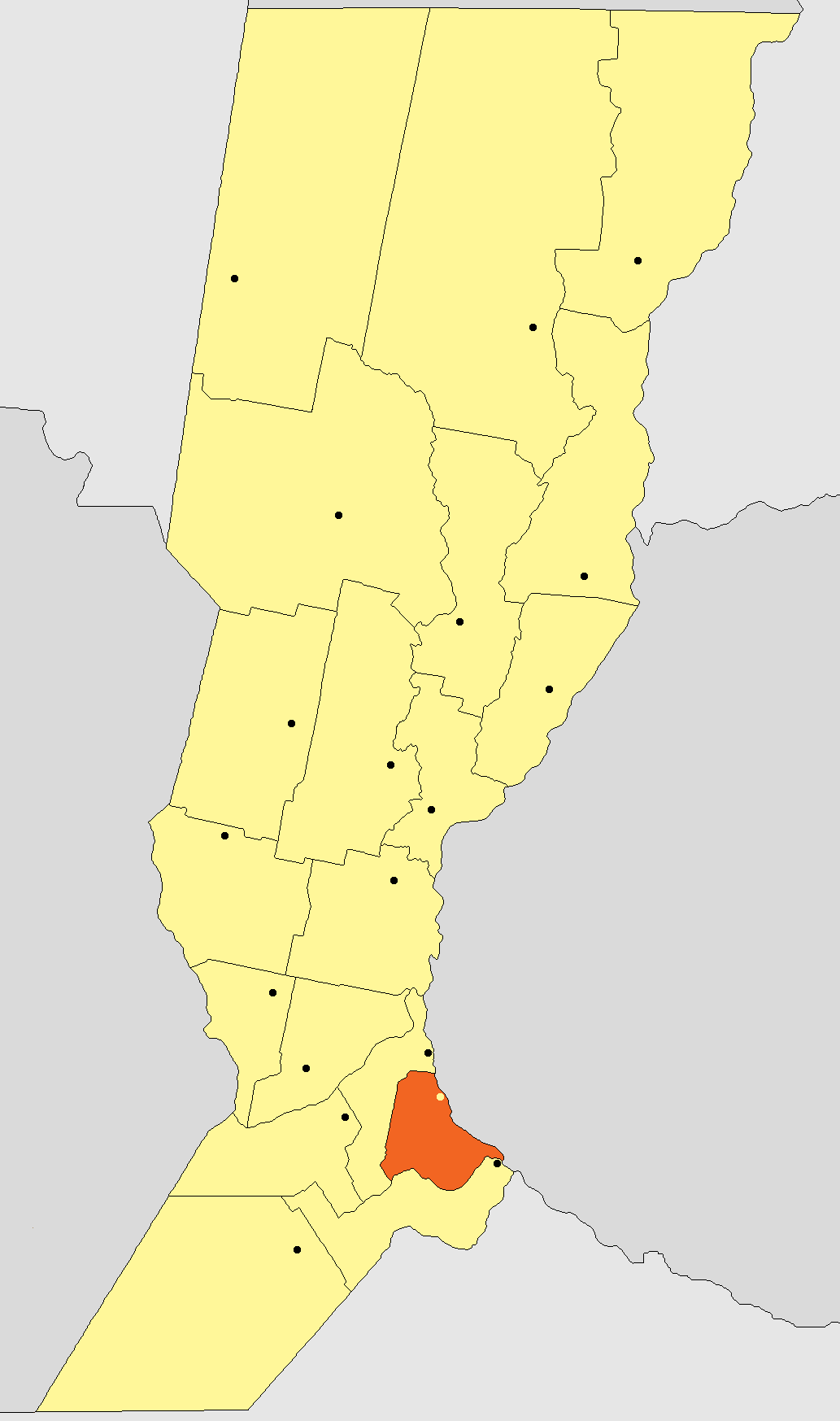
- Location of Rosario Department within Santa Fe Province
- Coordinates: 32°57′S 60°40′W
- Country: Argentina
- Province: Santa Fe
- Head town: Rosario

Area
  - Total: 1,890 km^{2} (730 sq mi)

Population
  - Total: 1,342,301
  - Density: 710/km^{2} (1,840/sq mi)
- Time zone: UTC-3 (ART)

The Rosario Department (in Spanish, Departamento Rosario) is an administrative subdivision (departamento) of the province of Santa Fe, Argentina. It is located on the south of the province, with its eastern border coinciding with the provincial border along the Paraná River. It has an area of 1,890 square kilometres (730 sq mi) and a population of 1.3 million, with a population density of about 700 inhabitants/km^{2}. This department is the most populated in the province (comprising more than one third of the total population).

The department's head town is the city of Rosario; most of the population is concentrated in its metropolitan area (Greater Rosario), which reaches north into the neighboring San Lorenzo Department. Other important cities and towns are Ibarlucea, Granadero Baigorria, Funes, Pérez, Piñero, Zavalla, Pueblo Nuevo, Villa Diego, Álvarez, Villa Amelia, Acebal, Uranga, Arroyo Seco, Fighiera, and Coronel Bogado.

Limiting the Rosario Department to the south is the Constitución Department (whose head town is Villa Constitución) and to the east and north, the San Lorenzo Department (head town San Lorenzo). On the eastern border, along the Paraná River, is the heart of the Industrial Corridor, a productive area with a concentration of light industries (such as soybean oil and pod processing) and major ports.
