= Libertador Municipality, Táchira =

Municipality in Táchira, Venezuela

Libertador Municipality Municipio Libertador
- Municipality
- Flag Seal

- Location in Táchira

- Location in Venezuela
- Country: Venezuela
- State: Táchira
- Founded: 1935
- Municipal seat: Abejales

Government
  - Mayor: Renny Rengifo Sánchez (PSUV)

Area
  - Total: 1,108.2 km^{2} (427.9 sq mi)

Population (2011)
  - Total: 20,020
  - Density: 18.07/km^{2} (46.79/sq mi)
- Time zone: UTC−4 (VET)

Libertador Municipality is one of the 29 municipalities in Táchira state, Venezuela. The municipality has a total surface of 1139 km^{2} and it has some 20,020 inhabitants (2011 census). Its capital is Abejales.
