= La Cañada de Urdaneta Municipality =

Municipality in Zulia, Venezuela

La Cañada de Urdaneta Municipality Municipio La Cañada de Urdaneta
- Municipality

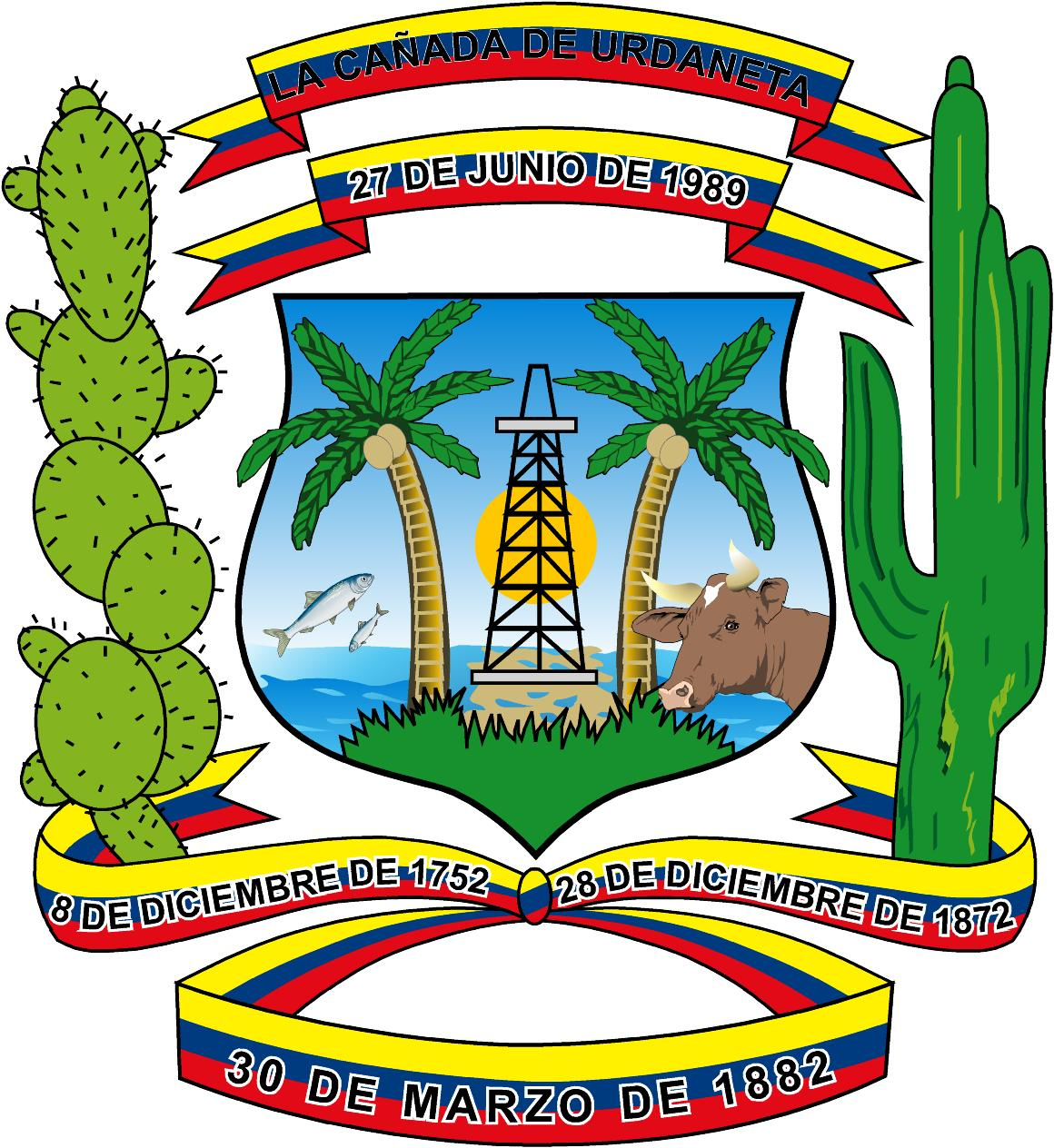
- Flag Seal

- Location in Zulia

- Location in Venezuela
- Country: Venezuela
- State: Zulia
- Founded: 1989
- Municipal seat: Concepción[*]

Government
  - Mayor: Roberto Soto (PSUV)

Area
  - Total: 2,040 km^{2} (790 sq mi)

Population (2023)
  - Total: 92,463
  - Density: 45.3/km^{2} (117/sq mi)
- Time zone: UTC−4 (VET)

La Cañada de Urdaneta Municipality is located in Zulia, Venezuela. It was founded in 1989. The municipality has a total surface of 2040 km^{2} and it has some 92,463 inhabitant (2023 census). Its capital is Concepción.
