= Fray Luis Beltrán, Santa Fe =

Fray Luis Beltrán
- City
- Location of Fray Luis Beltrán in Argentina
- Coordinates: 32°47′S 60°44′W
- Country: Argentina
- Province: Santa Fe
- Department: San Lorenzo

Government
  - Intendant: Mariano Cominelli (PJ)

Area
  - Total: 8 km^{2} (3.1 sq mi)

Population (2010 census)
  - Total: 15,176
  - Density: 1,900/km^{2} (4,900/sq mi)
- Time zone: UTC−3 (ART)
- CPA base: S2156
- Dialing code: +54 341

Fray Luis Beltrán is a small city in the province of Santa Fe, Argentina, located within the metropolitan area of Greater Rosario, north of the city of Rosario, on the western shore of the Paraná River. It had a population of about 15,000 inhabitants at the 2010 census [INDEC].

The town was founded in 1892 by Domingo Borghi. Its name is a homage to a friar of the San Carlos Monastery in nearby San Lorenzo, where the wounded of the rebel forces of General José de San Martín were tended after the Battle of San Lorenzo.

Fray Luis Beltrán is divided into two parts by the National Route 11. There is a military battalion, a factory of weapons and military supplies (Fábrica Militar Fray Luis Beltrán ), and a chemical plant (Sulfacid S. A.).
