= Arroyo del Medio =

River in Argentina

Coordinates: 33°18′16″S 60°16′52″W

The Arroyo del Medio (Spanish, lit. "Middle Creek" or "Middle Stream") is a small river in Argentina, located on (and serving as) the border between the provinces of Buenos Aires and Santa Fe. Its catchment basin comprises about 3,200 square kilometres (1,200 mi^{2}). The Arroyo empties into the Paraná River at the city of San Nicolás de los Arroyos, Buenos Aires, opposite the Constitución Department in Santa Fe.
