= Ibarlucea =

- Town
- Location of Ibarlucea in Argentina
- Coordinates: 32°51′S 60°48′W
- Country: Argentina
- Province: Santa Fe
- Department: Rosario

Population
  - Total: 4,402
- Time zone: UTC−3 (ART)
- CPA base: S2142
- Dialing code: +54 341

Ibarlucea is a town (comuna) in the province of Santa Fe, Argentina. It has 4,402 inhabitants per the 2010 census [INDEC]. It is located on National Route 34, immediately north-west of Rosario, forming part of the Greater Rosario metropolitan area, and 155 km (96 mi) south of the provincial capital Santa Fe.

The area was known as Kilómetro 409 around the end of the 19th century, since during 12 years, beginning in 1891, it was a settlement centered on a train station for the Rosario–Tucumán line of the Ferrocarril General Manuel Belgrano. The town proper was founded in 1903 by Rita Alcácer de Ybarlucea, who donated lands formerly owned by her deceased husband Melitón Ybarlucea (ibar luzea in Standard Basque means "the long valley") to be used for public offices, streets, a square, a church, etc. The town depended on a support commission based in Rosario, until the local communal institutions were created on 5 April 1915.
