= Roldán, Santa Fe =

City in Argentina

Roldán
- City
- Location of Roldán Roldán (Argentina)
- Coordinates: 32°54′04″S 60°54′26″W
- Country: Argentina
- Province: Santa Fe
- Department: San Lorenzo

Government
  - Intendant: Daniel Escalante (UCR)

Population (2010)
  - Total: 14,299
- Time zone: UTC-3 (ART)
- CPA base: S2134

Roldán is a small city in the province of Santa Fe, Argentina, located within the metropolitan area of Greater Rosario. According to the 2001 census, it had a population of 11,470 inhabitants. Its area is 114 km².

Roldán is about 23 km (14 mi) west of the center of the city of Rosario, within the San Lorenzo Department, beside the National Route 9 (near Funes) and the Rosario-Córdoba Highway.

It was founded in 1870, and officially became a city in 1987.

From 2001 to 2021, the Intendant of Roldán was José María Pedretti, the current Intendant is Daniel Escalante.
