= Libertador Municipality, Aragua =

Libertador Municipality Municipio Libertador
- Municipality
- Flag Coat of arms

- Location in Aragua

- Location in Venezuela
- Coordinates: 10°09′59″N 67°33′51″W
- Country: Venezuela
- State: Aragua

Government
  - Mayor: Gonzalo Díaz (MVR)

Area
  - Total: 80.0 km^{2} (30.9 sq mi)

Population (2011)
  - Total: 114,355
  - Density: 1,430/km^{2} (3,700/sq mi)
- Time zone: UTC−4 (VET)
- Area code(s): 0243
- Website: Official website

The Libertador Municipality is one of the 18 municipalities (municipios) that makes up the Venezuelan state of Aragua and, according to the 2011 census by the National Institute of Statistics of Venezuela, the municipality has a population of 114,355. The town of Palo Negro is the municipal seat of the Libertador Municipality.

== Name ==
The municipality is one of a number in Venezuela named "Libertador Municipality", in honour of Venezuelan independence hero Simón Bolívar.

== Demographics ==
The Libertador Municipality, according to a 2007 population estimate by the National Institute of Statistics of Venezuela, has a population of 87,520 (up from 78,427 in 2000). This amounts to 5.3% of the state's population. The municipality's population density is 1,683.08 inhabitants per square kilometre (4,359.2/sq mi).

== Government ==
The mayor of the Libertador Municipality is Gonzalo Díaz, re-elected on October 31, 2004, with 47% of the vote. The municipality is divided into two parishes; Capital Libertador and San Martín de Porres (created on January 30, 1995).
