= Greater Rosario =

Argentine metropolitan area

Coordinates: 32°57′04″S 60°39′59″W

- Metropolitan area
- Rosario Metropolitan Area; Área Metropolitana de Rosario
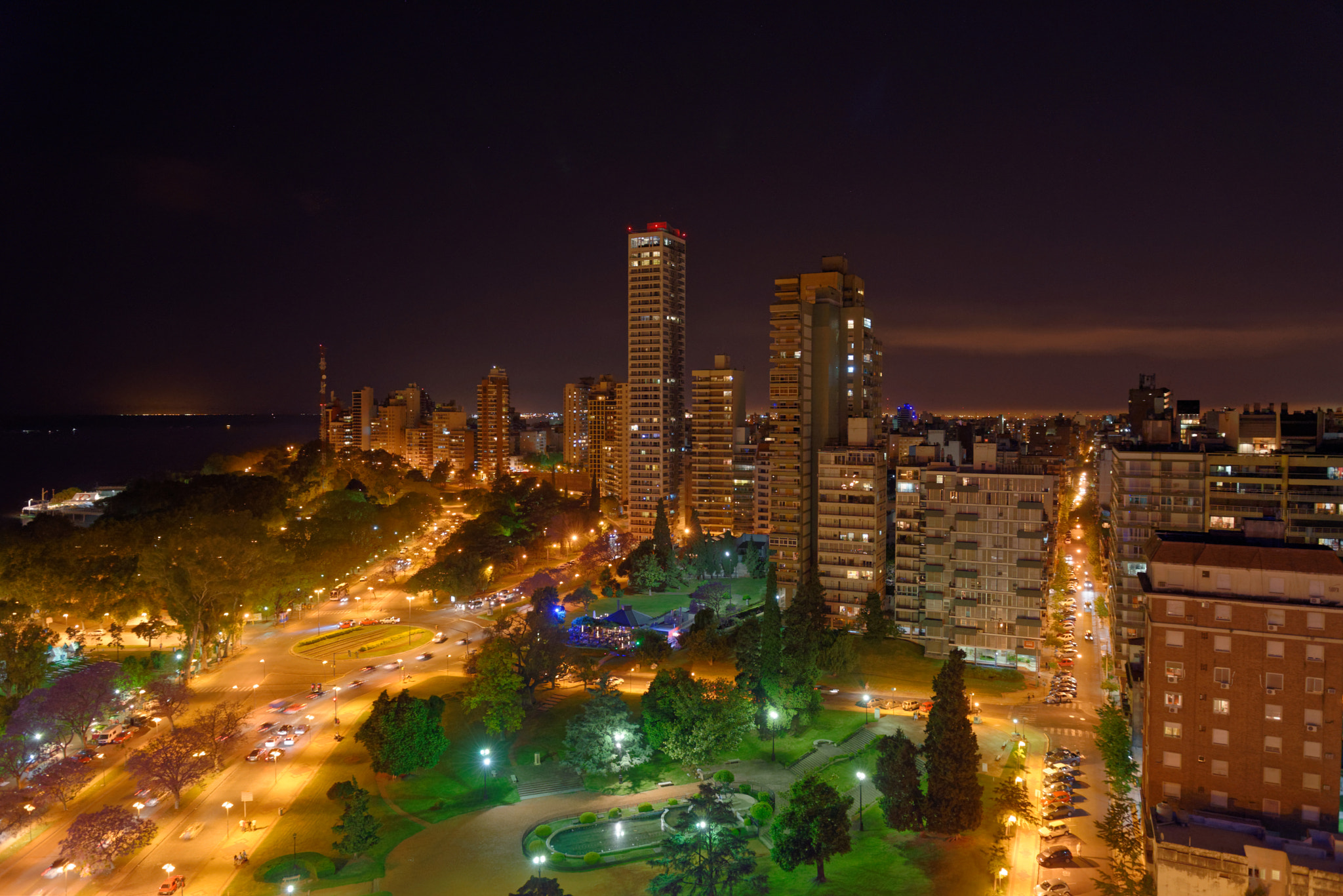
- Rosario City

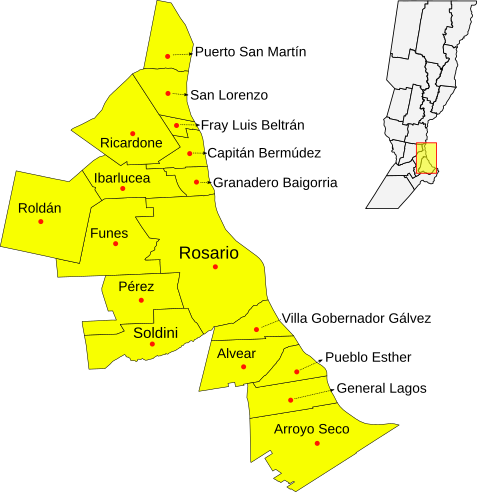
- Map of Greater Rosario
- Country: Argentina
- Core city: Rosario

Area
  - Metro: 589 km^{2} (227 sq mi)

Population (INDEC 2022 census)
  - Metropolitan area: 1,455,668
  - Metro density: 2,471.4/km^{2} (6,401/sq mi)

Greater Rosario is the metropolitan area of the city of Rosario, in the province of Santa Fe, Argentina. This metropolis has a population of about 1.3 million (1,455,668 million inhabitants) thus being Argentina's third most populated urban settlement, after Buenos Aires and Córdoba.

The Greater Rosario comprises Rosario itself (population about 910,000) and a large area around it, spreading in all directions except eastward (because of the Paraná River). Directly to the south it includes the city of Villa Gobernador Gálvez, with a population of about 75,000, at about 10 km (6.2 mi) from the center of Rosario.

To the west and south-west there are several smaller towns and cities (Funes, Roldán, Pérez, Soldini); Roldán is 23 km from Rosario's center. These settlements were incorporated into the metropolis due to their vicinity to major roads leading into Rosario, and many people living there habitually commute to Rosario.

The farthest end is to the north, following the coast of the river; from Rosario one finds, in succession and usually merging into each other, the towns of Granadero Baigorria, Capitán Bermúdez, Fray Luis Beltrán, San Lorenzo (already in a different departamento, with a population of over 40,000), and Puerto General San Martín, the last being at a distance of 35 km from Rosario.

The north of the Greater Rosario is one end of an area traditionally called Cordón Industrial ("Industrial Corridor"), since it was traditionally a heavily industrialized productive region. The prelude to the economic crisis in the 1990s largely dismantled the industrial infrastructure and damaged agricultural exports. As of 2006 the recovery of national economy has revitalized them, but high levels of poverty and unemployment persist (the last official survey indicates that 27.4% of the population is under the poverty line).

== Transportation ==
See also Transportation in Argentina.

Greater Rosario has a fluid short-distance transportation scheme. Several of Rosario's urban bus lines cross the limits of the city into the neighboring towns (keeping the common urban fee), and many low-cost interurban short-distance lines depart at regular intervals from the Bus Terminal and the transport node at Plaza Sarmiento.

Greater Rosario
Towns and cities
- Capitán Bermúdez
- Fray Luis Beltrán
- Funes
- Granadero Baigorria
- Puerto General San Martín
- Pérez
- Roldán
- Rosario
- San Lorenzo
- Soldini
- Villa Gobernador Gálvez

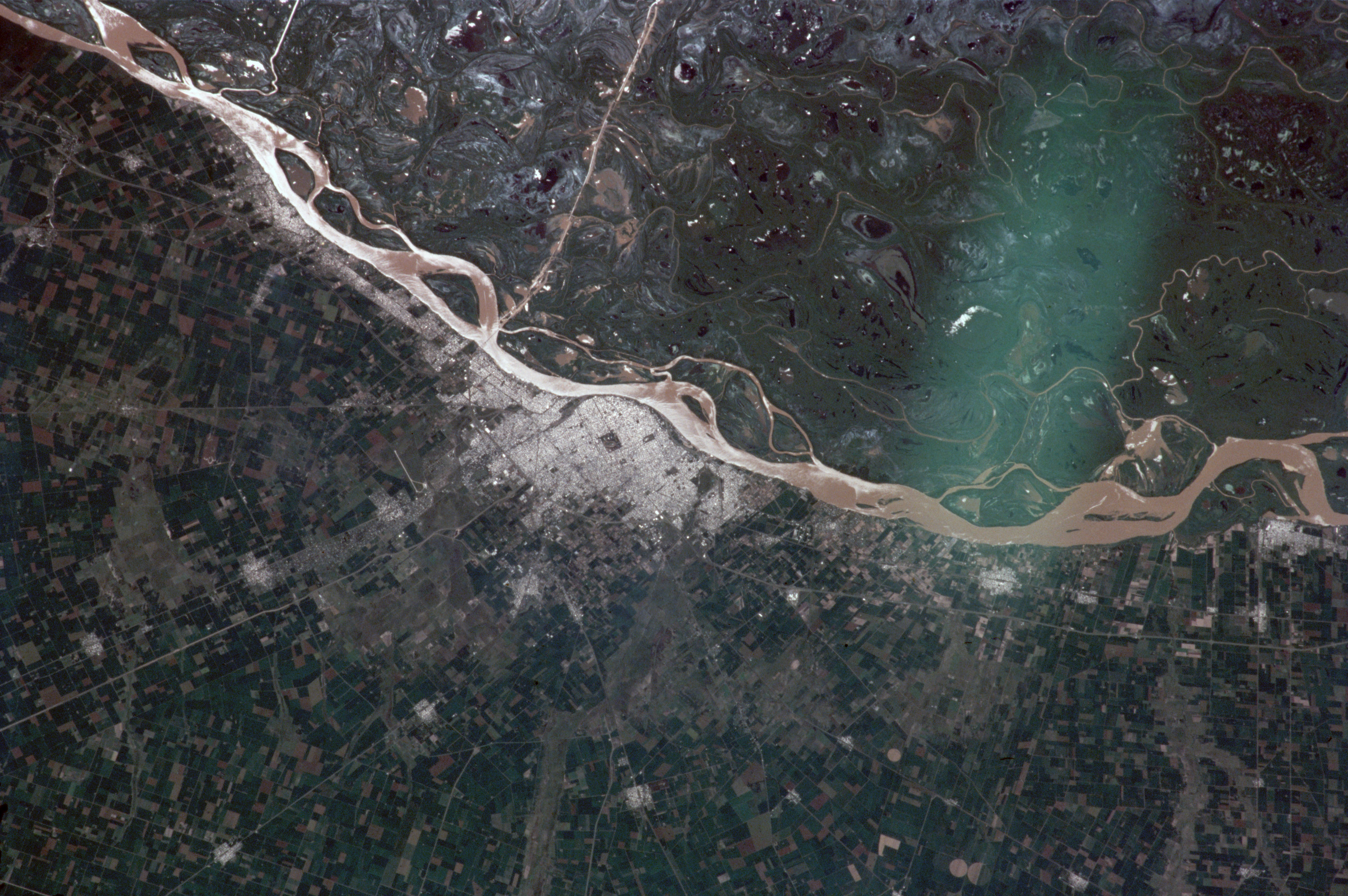
Rosario and its region from space.

The metropolitan area is also a node of national and international transportation. Major roads and highways sprout from Rosario's Avenida de Circunvalación, originally a city-encircling two-way avenue. National Route 11 goes north through the towns already mentioned and towards the provincial capital, Santa Fe; the General Estanislao López Highway provides a faster direct path. To the south, National Route 9 crosses the provincial border and the Industrial Corridor continues up to San Nicolás de los Arroyos, province of Buenos Aires. Route 9 also runs west through Santa Fe and towards Córdoba. In addition, a national highway is being built, ultimately to reach the Córdoba City. To the east, the metropolis communicates with the neighboring Entre Ríos (and from there Uruguay and Brazil) through the Rosario-Victoria Bridge, opened in 2003.

Long-distance passenger trains are operated by Trenes Argentinos along the General Bartolomé Mitre Railway between Retiro Mitre Station in Buenos Aires and Rosario Norte Station via Rosario Sur Station. Trains leave once per day in each direction and take approximately 6 and a half hours to travel the 315 km (196 mi) distance.

Much of the agricultural exports of the north of Argentina go overseas through the ports of the Greater Rosario on the Paraná River, the Port of Rosario and Puerto General San Martín being the most important ones.

Air traffic in the area is serviced by the Rosario International Airport (IATA: ROS, ICAO: SAAR), located 13 km from the center and partly in lands of the city of Funes.

== See also ==
- Geography of Rosario
