= Pérez, Santa Fe =

City in Santa Fe Province, Argentina

Pérez
- City
- Coat of arms

- Location of Pérez in Argentina
- Coordinates: 33°00′S 60°46′W
- Country: Argentina
- Province: Santa Fe
- Department: Rosario

Government
  - Intendant: Pablo Corsalini (Justicialist Party)

Area
  - Total: 67 km^{2} (26 sq mi)

Population (2010 census)
  - Total: 26,448
  - Density: 390/km^{2} (1,000/sq mi)
- Time zone: UTC−3 (ART)
- CPA base: S2121
- Dialing code: +54 341

Pérez is a city in the province of Santa Fe, Argentina. It is part of the Greater Rosario metropolitan area, and lies 175 km south of the provincial capital (Santa Fe). It has a population of about 26,000 inhabitants (2010 census [INDEC]).

The town was founded in 1876 by Eduardo Pérez and María Pérez de Jolly. It became officially a commune (comuna) on 20 November 1905, and a city on 4 November 1971.
