= Firma y Odilo Estévez Municipal Decorative Art Museum =

Coordinates: 32.9466°S 60.6331°W

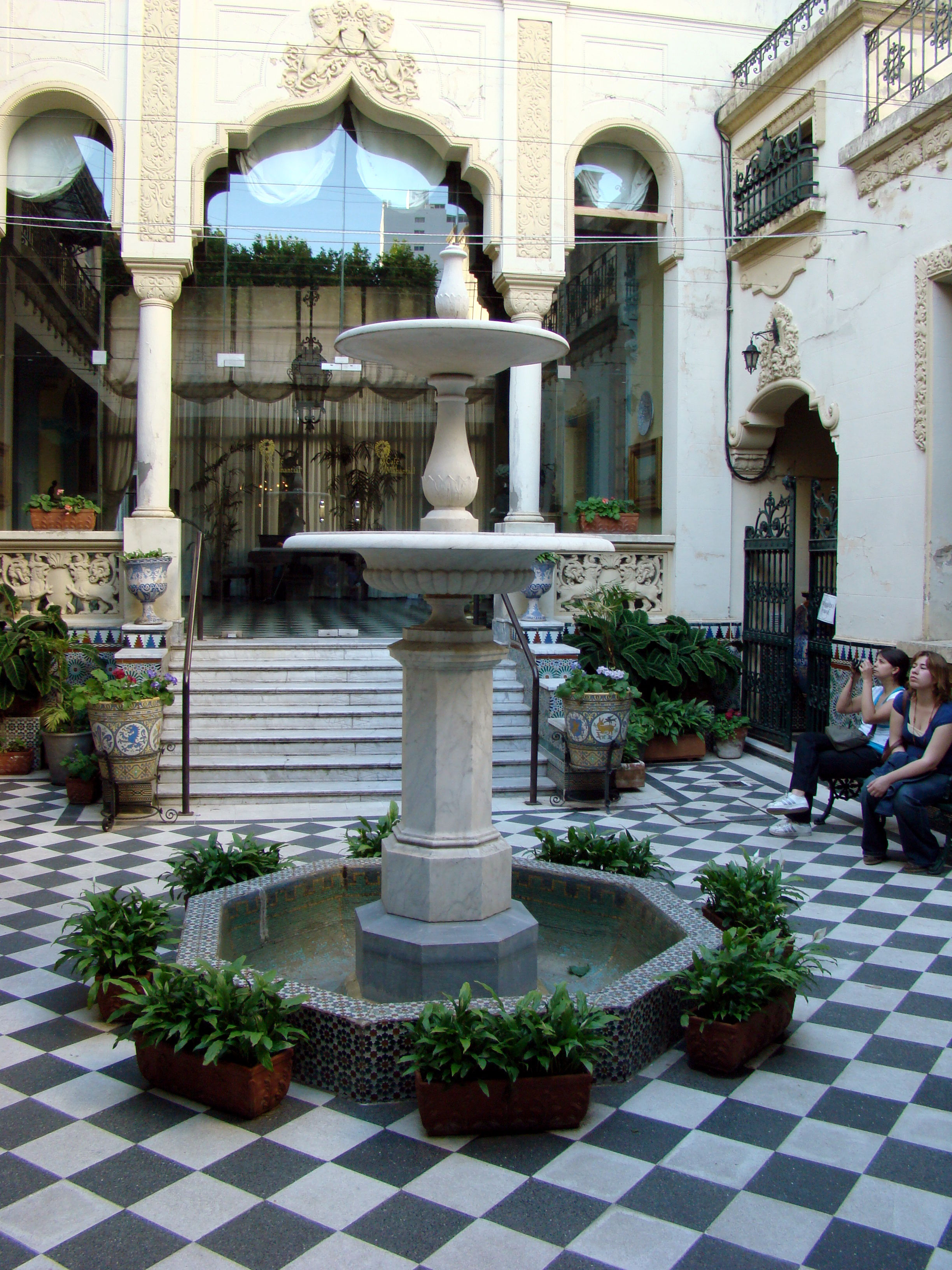
The inner courtyard

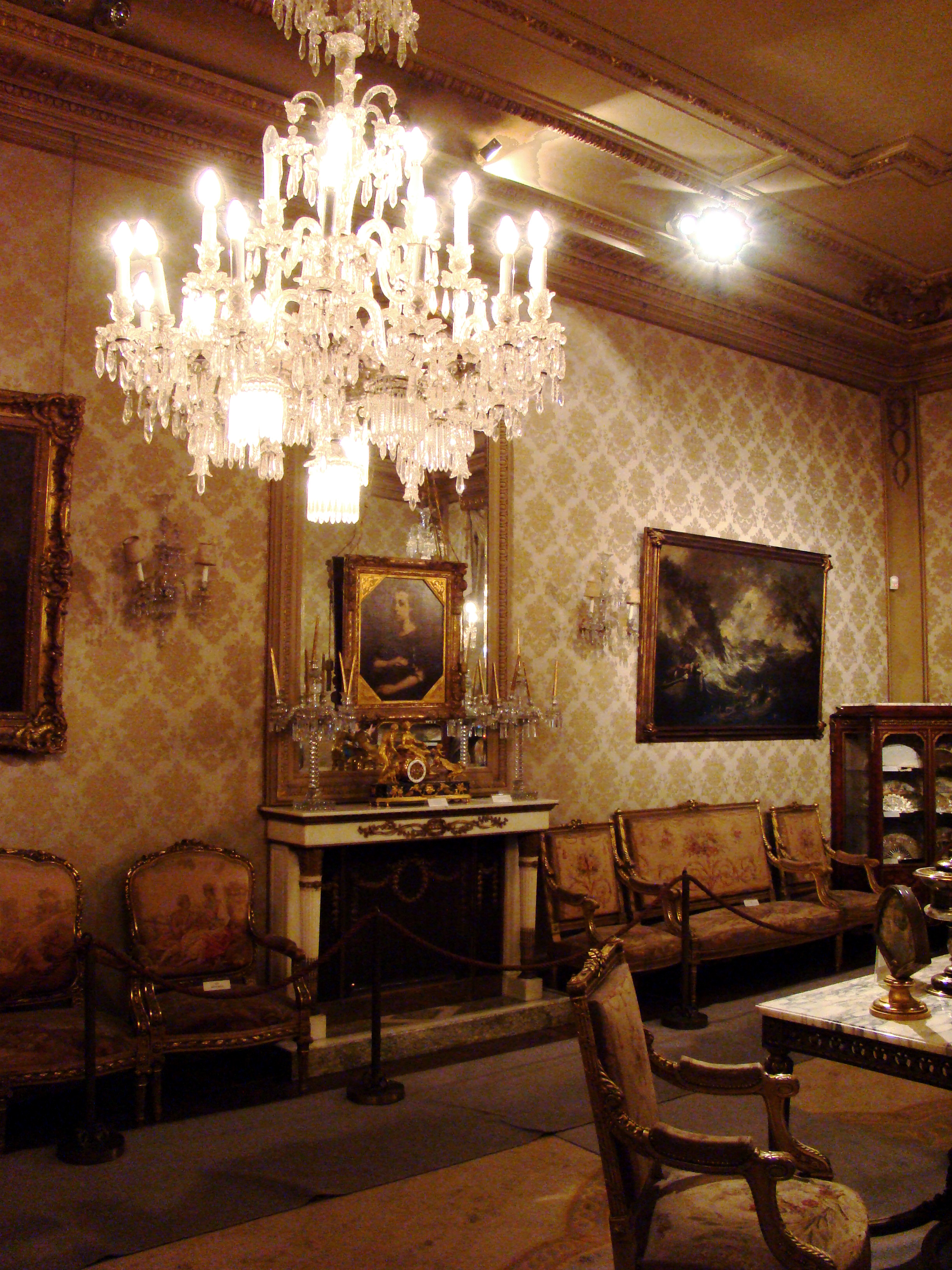
One of the rooms in the museum

Firma y Odilo Estévez Municipal Decorative Art Museum (in Spanish, Museo de Arte Decorativo Firma y Odilo Estévez) is the former home of the Estévez family in Rosario, Argentina, which was donated to the Municipality of Rosario and turned into a museum.

Mrs. Firma Mayor de Estévez bequeathed her mansion and its contents to the city, in memory of her husband Odilo Estévez. The municipal government assumed its ownership in 1966, and inaugurated the museum officially on 8 July 1968.

The museum is located in the historical core of Rosario, in front of Plaza 25 de Mayo, at the starting point of the old village, near the town hall (Palacio de los Leones) and the Cathedral. Administratively, it depends on the Culture and Education Secretariat of the Municipality of Rosario. It showcases a permanent exhibition of artwork that was gathered by the Estévez family during almost 30 years, including Spanish furniture from the 16th, 17th and 18th century and copies of 18th-century French furniture; a collection of European paintings; a number of sculptures; works in ivory, glass, porcelain, jade, and silver (European, pre-Columbian and Asian); tapestries, carpets, and fans.
