= Districts of Rosario =

Diagram of the Municipal Districts of Rosario.

The districts of the city of Rosario, province of Santa Fe, Argentina are administrative divisions created to decentralise the workings of the municipal government.

Rosario is divided into six districts, most named by location although the eastmost is called Center District as it includes the oldest part of the city historically called Centro (center). The data given below are from the 2001 census [INDEC].

== Justification ==
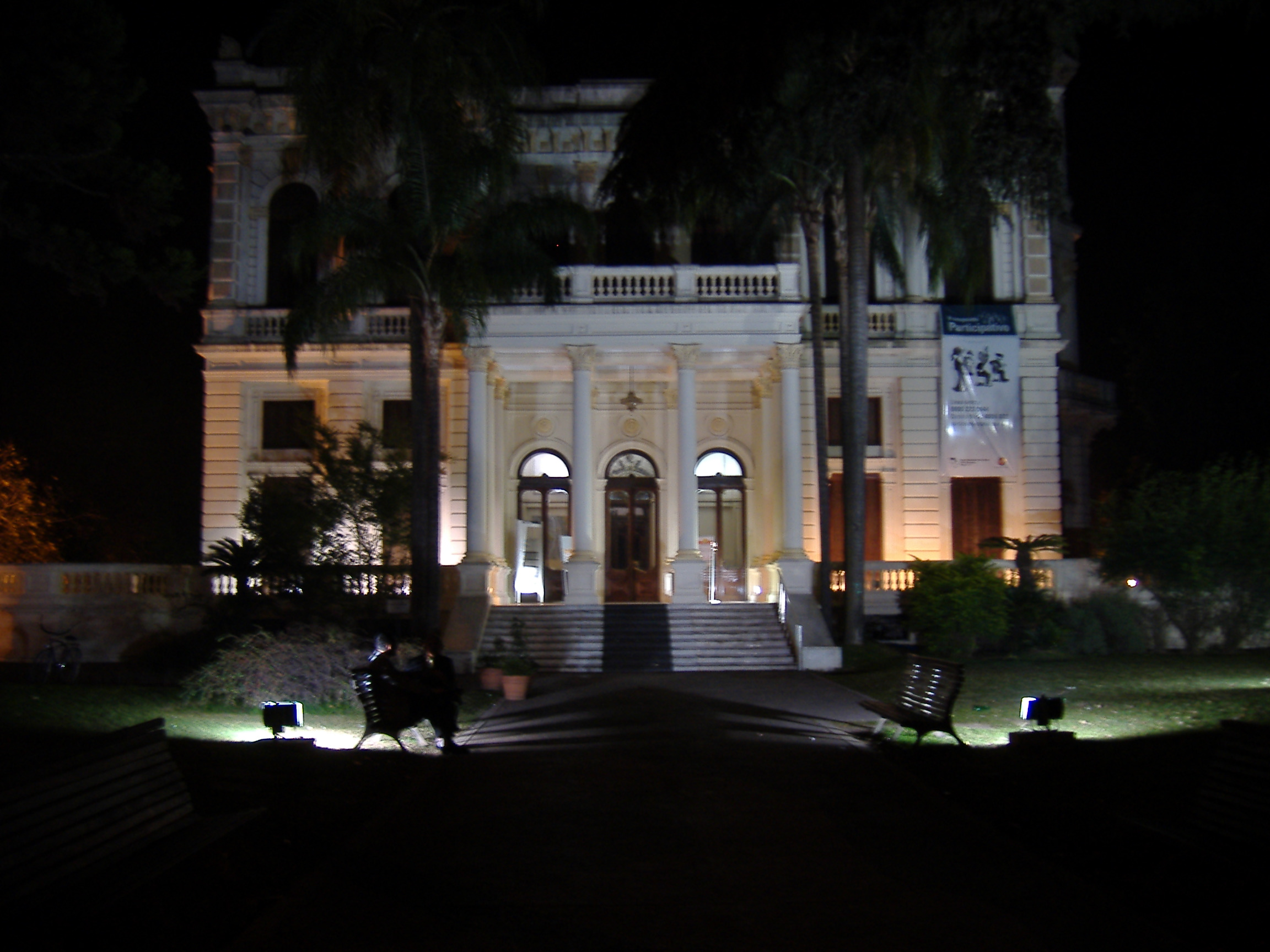
Villa Hortensia, the seat of the North District.

The Municipality of Rosario justifies the division of the city into districts as a part of an ambitious program to distribute not only administrative tasks and services but also cultural activities. The idea was put in practice for the first time in 1997 with the opening as a Municipal Center of the old mansion called Villa Hortensia in the northern barrio of Alberdi.

Before that time, most of the commercial, administrative and cultural activity in the city took place in a small area of no more than five square kilometres in the so-called microcentro, and especially in the municipal building (Palacio de los Leones), which meant that most people in the city needed to travel relatively long distances into an already crowded downtown to conduct business. This tended to overwhelm the capacity of the personnel and the facilities. The idea of decentralisation tries to break the center-vs.-periphery model of the city and to bring the municipal government closer to the citizens.

== Municipal District Centers ==
The Municipal District Centers (Centros Municipales de Distrito, CMD) are intended for multiple activities. Each has an Administrative Services Area (for general citizen requests, communication with the municipal government, real estate records, etc.), an Urban Development Area, and a Socio-cultural and Health Services Area. They also host delegations of the Municipal Bank, the Civil Register (e.g. for civil marriages), the Provincial Tax Administration, and the provincial-level power company (Empresa Provincial de la Energía), water company (Aguas Santafesinas) and natural gas company (Litoral Gas).

As of 2006 there are five CMDs at work: the above-mentioned North District Center, Villa Hortensia, the West District CMD Felipe Moré, the Northwest District CMD Olga y Leticia Cossettini, the South District CMD Rosa Ziperovich, and the Center District CMD Antonio Berni.

== List of districts ==
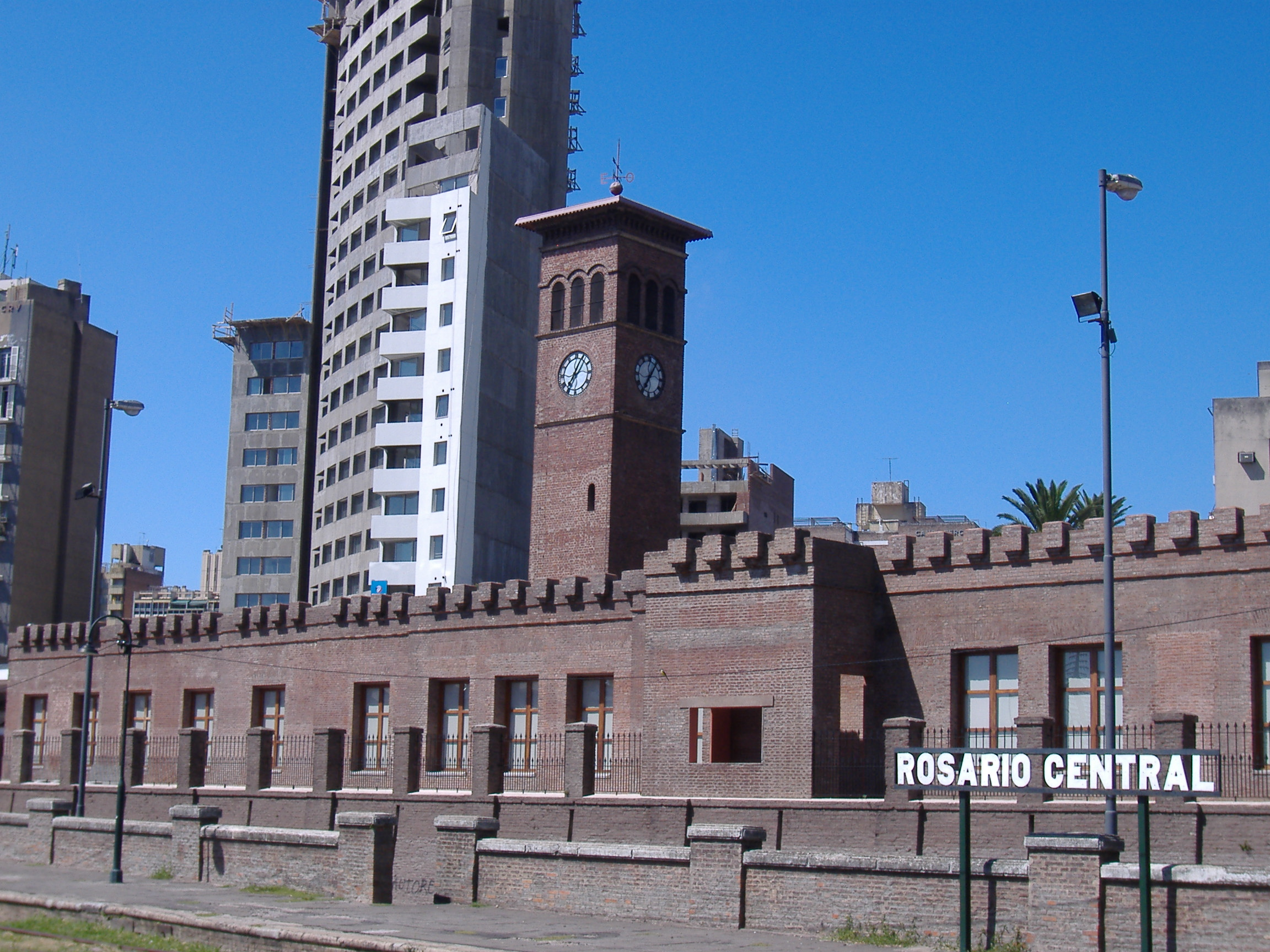
Seat of the Center District, at the former Rosario Central railway station.

=== Center District ===
Population: 261,047
Area: 20.37 km^{2} (11.45% of the Municipality)
Population density: 12,815 inhabitants/km^{2}
Housing: 110,152 units

=== North District ===
Population: 131,495
Area: 35.02 km^{2} (19.6% of the Municipality)
Population density: 3,744 inhabitants/km^{2}
Housing: 40,492 units

=== Northwest District ===
Population: 144,461
Area: 44.14 km^{2} (24.7% of the Municipality)
Population density: 3,273 inhabitants/km^{2}
Housing: 41,740 units

=== West District ===
Population: 106,356
Area: 40.21 km^{2} (22.5% of the Municipality)
Population density: 2,645 inhabitants/km^{2}
Housing: 31,625 units

=== Southwest District ===
Population: 103,446
Area: 20.19 km^{2} (11.3% of the Municipality)
Population density: 5,123 inhabitants/km^{2}
Housing: 28,284 units

=== South District ===
Population: 160,771
Area: 18.76 km^{2} (10.5% of the Municipality)
Population density: 8,569 inhabitants/km^{2}
Housing: 48,541 units

== Sources ==
- Municipality of Rosario - Decentralisation (in Spanish)
