= Alfredo Bigatti =

Argentine sculptor (1898–1964)

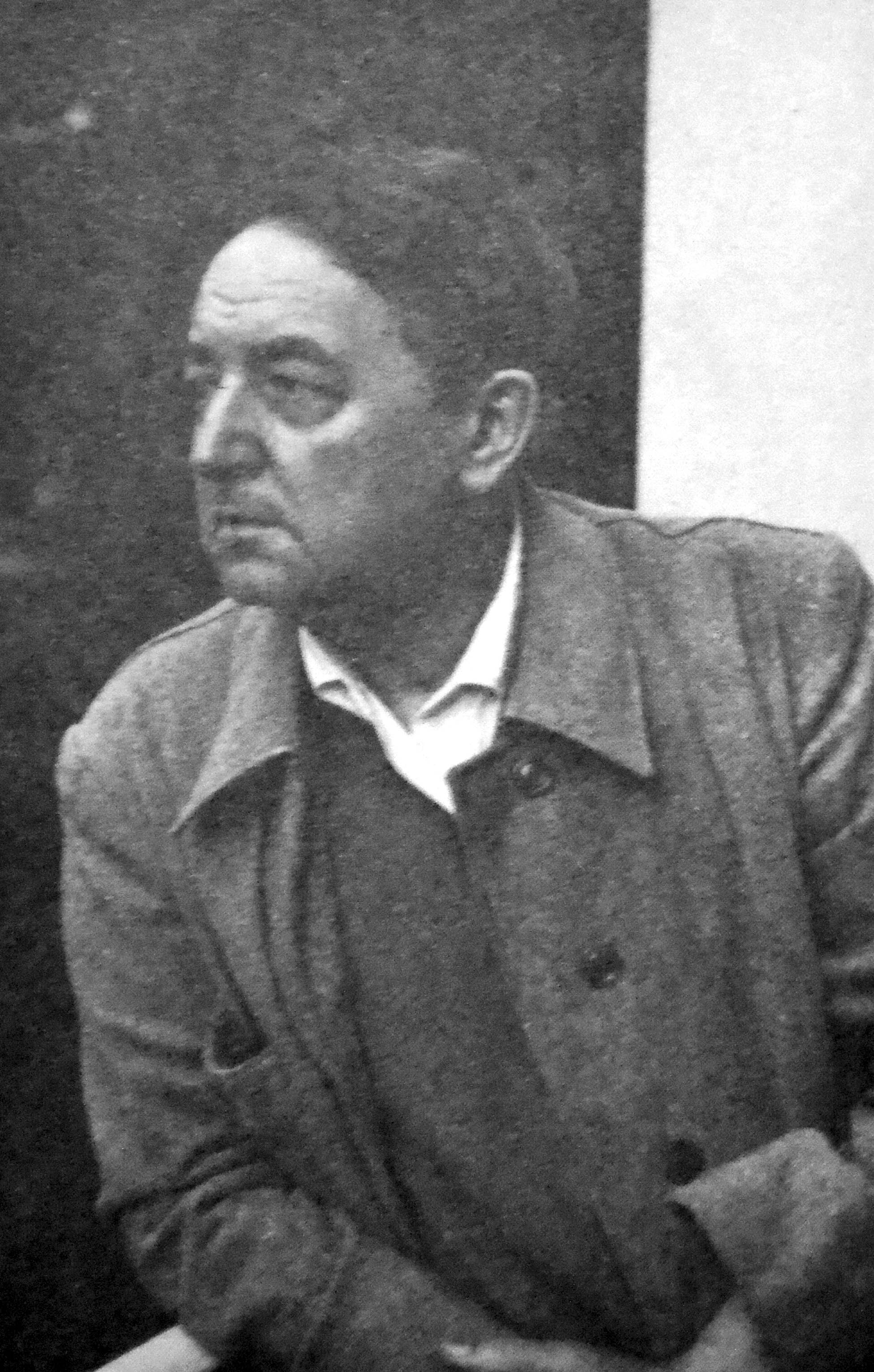
Alfredo Bigatti

Alfredo Bigatti (1898–1964) was an Argentine sculptor, medalist, and visual artist.

Born in Buenos Aires, Bigatti studied and then taught at the Academy of Fine Arts, and then toured numerous countries in Europe from 1924 through 1928, including studying in Paris with Antoine Bourdelle.

Bigatti's major work is probably the National Flag Memorial in Rosario, Santa Fe, in collaboration with architects Ángel Guido and Alejandro Bustillo, and fellow sculptors José Fioravanti and Eduardo Barnes.

In 1936 Bigatti married the Expressionist painter Raquel Forner.

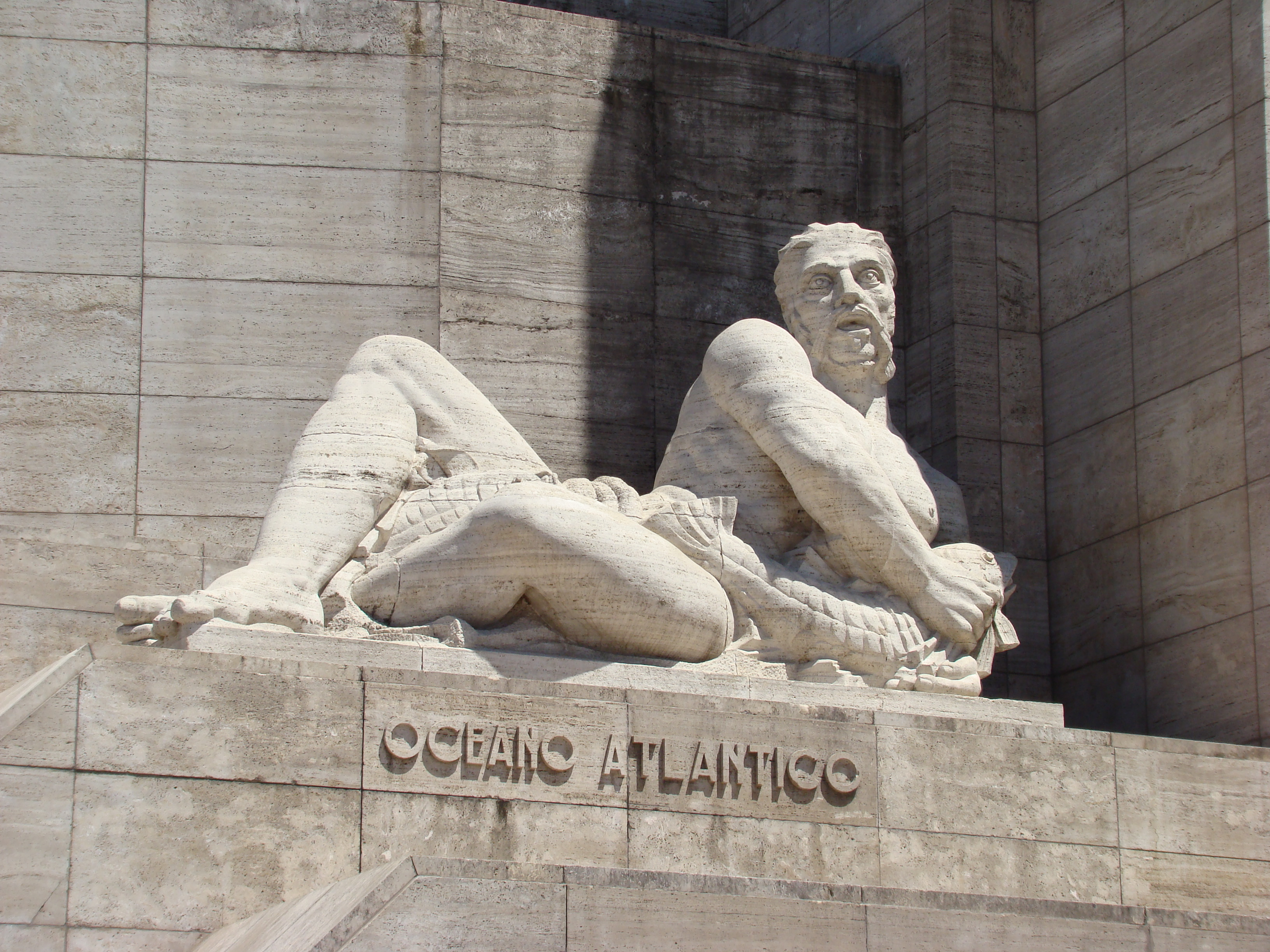
Recumbent figure of Atlantic Ocean, National Flag Memorial

== Sources ==
- online biography
- website of the Forner-Bigatti Foundation
