= Beatriz Guido =

Argentine novelist and screenwriter

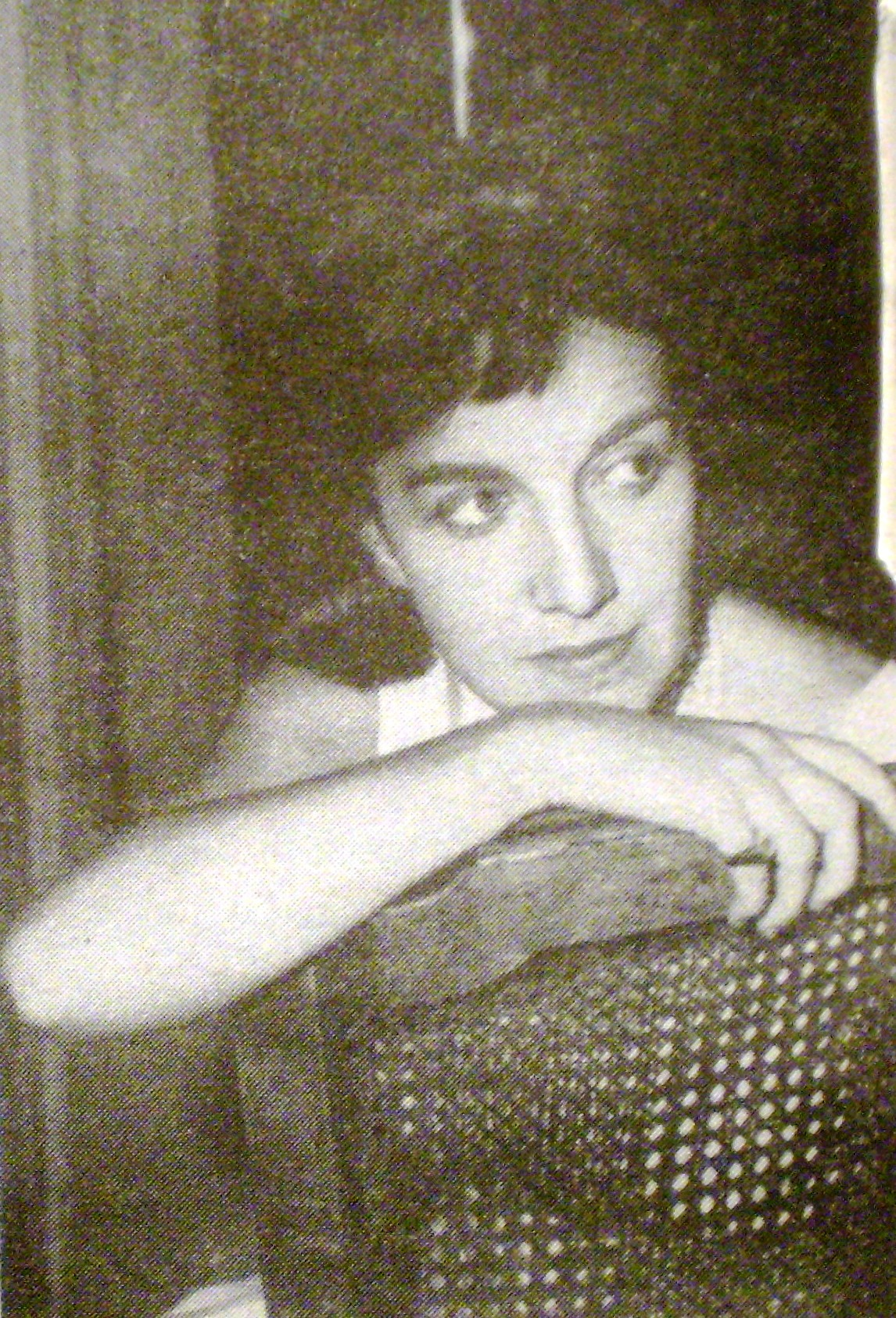
Beatriz Guido

Beatriz Guido (13 December 1922 – 4 March 1988) was an Argentine novelist and screenwriter.

== Early life and education ==
Guido was born in Rosario, Santa Fe Province, the daughter of architect Ángel Guido (renowned as the creator of the National Flag Memorial) and of Uruguayan actress Berta Eirin. She studied at the Faculty of Philosophy and Letters of the University of Buenos Aires.

She studied in Italy and France, following the perspectives of some existentialist authors. She collaborated with some cultural magazines writing articles about them. On those years, around 1950, she started tre translation of Gabriel Marcel's works from French to Spanish.

== Career ==
With her first novel, La casa del ángel, she won the EMECE prize in 1954. It was the beginning of several best seller publications, that continued with La caída, Fin de fiesta and, especially, El incendio y las visperas. All of them put her into the public scene.

The adaptation of La casa del ángel to film, made by Leopoldo Torre Nilsson, was also the first collaboration between them (a creative team that reflects their sentimental life together), and continued for more than twenty years (and 18 films), until his death in 1978. After that, she collaborated with other directors. A wide part of her scripts (all of the co-written with other authors) was based on her own novels and short stories.

She also wrote some theatre plays and articles for the press. Because of her outspoken anti-Peronism, she was branded a "right-wing writer" and a "false aristocrat" by the government of Juan Perón and some critics from her time.

== Later life and death ==
In 1983 she won the National Literature Prize. In 1984 she won the Konex Merit Diploma on Letters. In 1984 she was named Cultural Attaché of the Argentinean Embassy in Spain. She died in Madrid on March 4, 1988.

== Tributes ==
In 2022 she was distinguished as illustrious personality born in Rosario. In 2023 the Buenos Aires International Independent Film Festival (Bafici) organised at tribute for her centenary with the screening of three emblematic films and an exhibition of personal papers curated by José Miguel Onaindia and Diego Sabenés, who also presented an essay about her contribution to literature and film. The book, Espía privilegiada, included 15 unpublished texts by Guido (articles, short stories, poems, letters, etc.) and become the first analysis of her work on film.

== Work ==
Novel

- La casa del ángel, Emecé, Buenos Aires, 1954. Premio Emecé 1954.
- La caída, Losada, Buenos Aires, 1956.
- Fin de fiesta, Losada, Buenos Aires, 1958
- El incendio y las vísperas, Losada, Buenos Aires, 1964.
- Escándalos y soledades, Losada, Buenos Aires, 1970.
- La invitación, Losada, Buenos Aires, 1979
- Soledad y el incendiario Abril, Buenos Aires, 1982.
- Rojo sobre rojo, Alianza Editorial, Buenos Aires, 1987.

Short Story

- Regreso a los hilos, Buenos Aires, 1947
- Estar en el mundo, El Ateneo, Buenos Aires, 1950
- La mano en la trampa, Losada, Buenos Aires, 1961
- El ojo único de la ballena, Editorial Merlín, Buenos Aires, 1971. Cuentos y obras teatrales.
- Los insomnes, Corregidor, Buenos Aires, 1973
- Piedra libre, Galerna, Buenos Aires, 1976
- Todos los cuentos el cuento, Planeta, Buenos Aires, 1979
- Apasionados, Losada, Buenos Aires, 1982. Novelas cortas.

Drama

- El puerto de Occidente, circa 1953.
- Esperando a los Castro, 1957.
- Y murieron en la hoguera, 1962.

== Selected filmography ==
- The Kidnapper (1958)
- Traitors of San Angel (1967)

== Bibliography ==
ONAINDIA, JOSÉ MIGUEL y SABANES, DIEGO (2023). Beatriz Guido, espía privilegiada. Un mundo propio en la literatura y el cine. Editorial Eudeba.
