= Villa Hortensia (Rosario) =

Mansion in Rosario, Santa Fe, Argentina

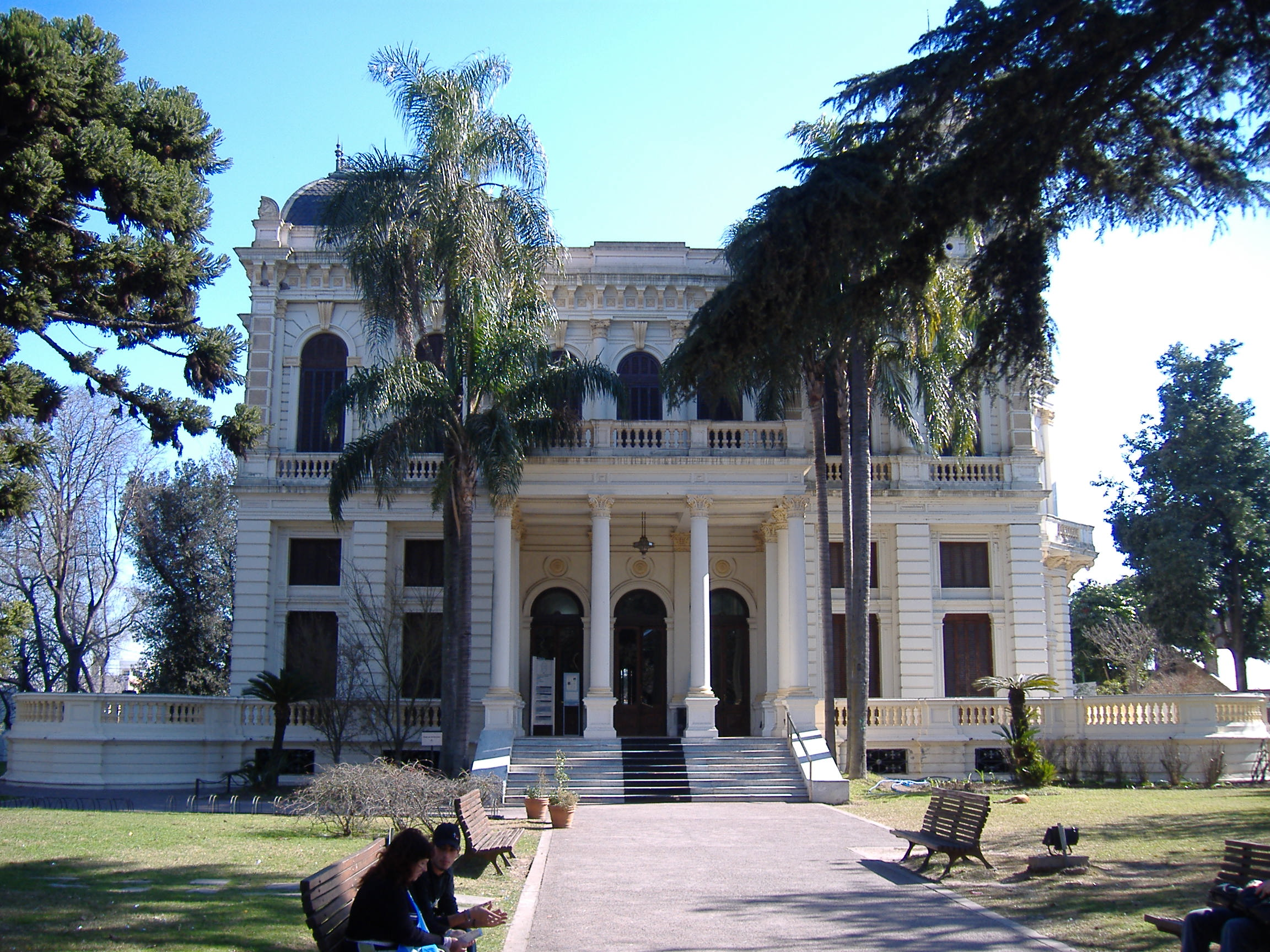
- Facade of the mansion in 2006

General information
- Type: Mansion
- Architectural style: Italianate
- Location: Warnes 1989, Rosario, Argentina
- Coordinates: 32°53′45″S 60°41′40″W
- Current tenants: Municipal District Center
- Inaugurated: 1890; 136 years ago
- Owner: José N. Puccio; Ciro Echesortu; Alfredo Rouillon; Municipality of Rosario (1996–present)

Design and construction
- Architect: Herbert Boyd Walker

National Historic Monument of Argentina
- Designated: 1989

Villa Hortensia is a mansion in the city of Rosario, province of Santa Fe, Argentina. It is located on 1917 Warnes St. in Barrio Alberdi, in the north-eastern part of Rosario. Built in 1890 as a familiar residence, the mansion was acquired by the Municipality of Rosario in 1996, having been used as seat of several municipal units since then.

== History ==
José Puccio (left) and Alfredo Rouillon were the first and last owners of the mansion

It was built in 1890 by architect Herbert Boyd Walker for José Nicolás Puccio, founder of then autonomous Alberdi. In early 1900s, the mansion was sold to Ciro Echesortu, and then in turn to Alfredo Rouillon, married to María Hortensia Echesortu (from whom the house got its name). The wealthy Rouillon family employed Villa Hortensia as a summer residence, taking advantage of its proximity to the Paraná River and its large, tree-shadowed gardens.

Maintenance of the mansion was neglected until, in 1989, it was declared a National Historic Monument. At the time it was under a serious threat of being condemned to demolition. The Villa was acquired by the Municipality of Rosario on 30 May 1996 in order to transform it into an administrative center, as part of an official decentralisation plan. Villa Hortensia was restored, emphasizing the original plans and materials, and was re-opened as the first Municipal District Center on 13 October 1997.

== Current use ==
Villa Hortensia hosts a citizen assistance office, a delegation of the Municipal Bank of Rosario, and offices of the water, natural gas and power companies, where the neighbors of the North District can pay for these services, place requests, etc. The mansion also has a marriage office. This allows for citizens to carry out administrative business near their homes, instead of travelling downtown to the main municipal offices (a 40-minute bus ride).

A survey conducted a month after the inauguration of Villa Hortensia found that the citizens of the North District used to travel an average of 8 km for administrative business before, a distance which has been reduced to only 1.5 km. Eighty percent of the citizens surveyed also consider the service in Villa Hortensia better than the one formerly provided in the downtown offices.

== See also ==
- Districts of Rosario, with an overview of the city's decentralisation plan and the Municipal District Centers.

== Bibliography ==
- Municipality of Rosario - Information on the North District Municipal Center.
- Rosario.com.ar - Directions and a location map for Villa Hortensia.
- Villa Hortensia, un palacio del siglo XIX. Tourism Office of Rosario.
- Ciudades para un futuro más sostenible. Descentralización y transformación estructural en Rosario (Argentina). 5 July 2000.
