= Forestello =

Forestello is an Italian surname. Notable people with the surname include:

- Adela Forestello (1923–2021), Argentine human rights activist and teacher
- Rubén Forestello (born 1971), Argentine football manager and former player
