= Mothers of the Plaza 25 de Mayo =

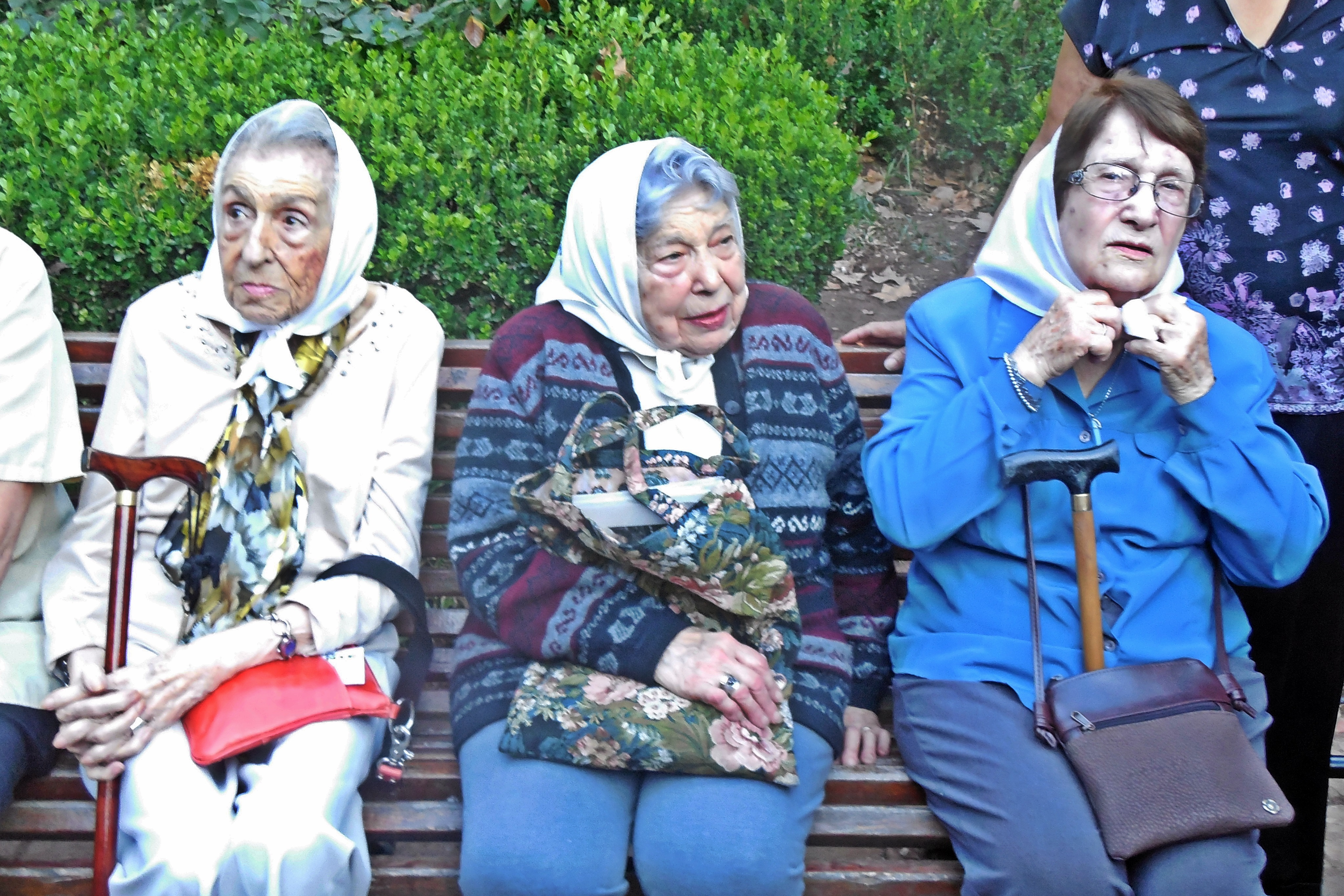
- Members of the Mothers of the Plaza 25 de Mayo - Adela Forestello (left), Elsa Massa (center) and Norma Vermeulen (right) - meet in the Plaza 25 de Mayo on May 4, 2017.
- Type: NGO
- Legal status: Active
- Purpose: Protection of human rights Focus on justice for victims of the Dirty War
- Headquarters: Plaza 25 de Mayo in Rosario
- Location: Rosario, Santa Fe Province, Argentina
- Region served: Santa Fe Province and Argentina
- Key people: Nelma Jalil, Élida López, Elsa Massa, Herminia Severini, Elvira Finsterwald, Noemí De Vicenzo, Matilde Toniolli, Lucrecia Martinez, Elena Belmont, Adela Forestello, Norma Vermeulen, Elisa Medina, Irma Molina, Marta C. Hernández, Laura Elsa Tasada.

The Mothers of the Plaza 25 de Mayo (Spanish: Madres de la Plaza 25 de Mayo), also known simply as Las Madres de Rosario or Madres Rosario, is an Argentine human rights group based in Rosario, Santa Fe Province, Argentina. The organization was created by a group of women who sought answers to the forced disappearance of their children during the Dirty War and military dictatorship from 1976 to 1983. The Mothers of the Plaza 25 de Mayo were initially founded as a Rosario-based branch of the larger, national Mothers of the Plaza de Mayo, but later developed their own association to focus on forced disappearances in Santa Fe Province.

Mothers of the Plaza 25 de Mayo takes its name from the Plaza 25 de Mayo in Rosario, where the mothers conduct their weekly march every Thursday to call for justice for their children.
