= Palace of the Lions =

Palace of the lions may refer to:

- Palacio de los Leones or Cuarto de los Leones, one of the Nasrid palaces of the Alhambra, Spain, receiving its name from its main courtyard, the Court of the Lions
- Palacio de los Leones, the main municipal building of the city of Rosario, Argentina, receiving its name from the two stone lions in front of its main portal
- Casa Leoni (meaning "House of the Lions" or "Lions' Palace"), a palace in Santa Venera, Malta, receiving its name from the four stone lions on the roof
- Singha Durbar (meaning "Lion's Palace"), a palace in Kathmandu, Nepal
