= Dr. Julio Marc Provincial Historical Museum =

Coordinates: 32.9567°S 60.6599°W

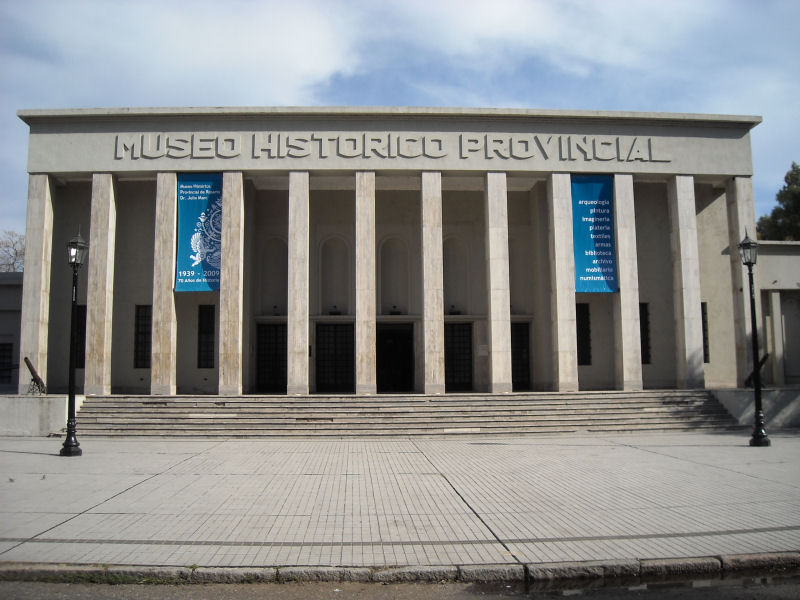
Dr. Julio Marc Provincial Historical Museum

The Dr. Julio Marc Provincial Historical Museum (in Spanish, Museo Histórico Provincial Dr. Julio Marc) is a museum in Rosario, Argentina. It comprises more than 30 rooms hosting collections of archaeological items, Spanish-American art, numismatics, pre-Columbian textile and silverwork crafts, and weapons, complemented by archives, a library, and collections of historical newspapers and maps.

The museum is located within the grounds of the Parque de la Independencia. It is administered by the government of the province of Santa Fe. It was founded in 1939, during the governorship of Manuel Iriondo, and received the name of Julio Marc, its first director. The architect of the neo-classical structure was Ángel Guido.
