= Ángel Guido =

Argentine architect, engineer and writer

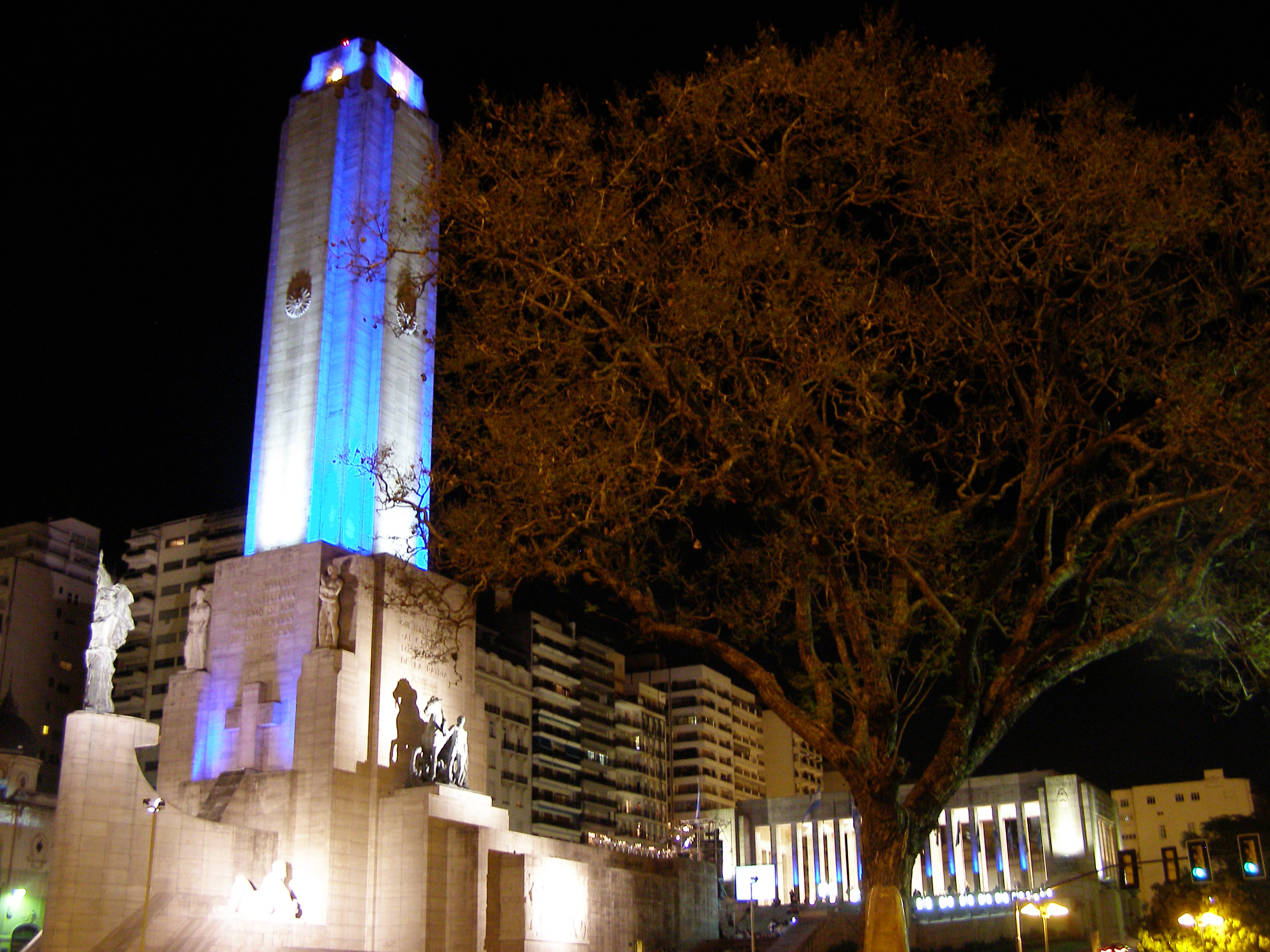
National Flag Memorial of Argentina

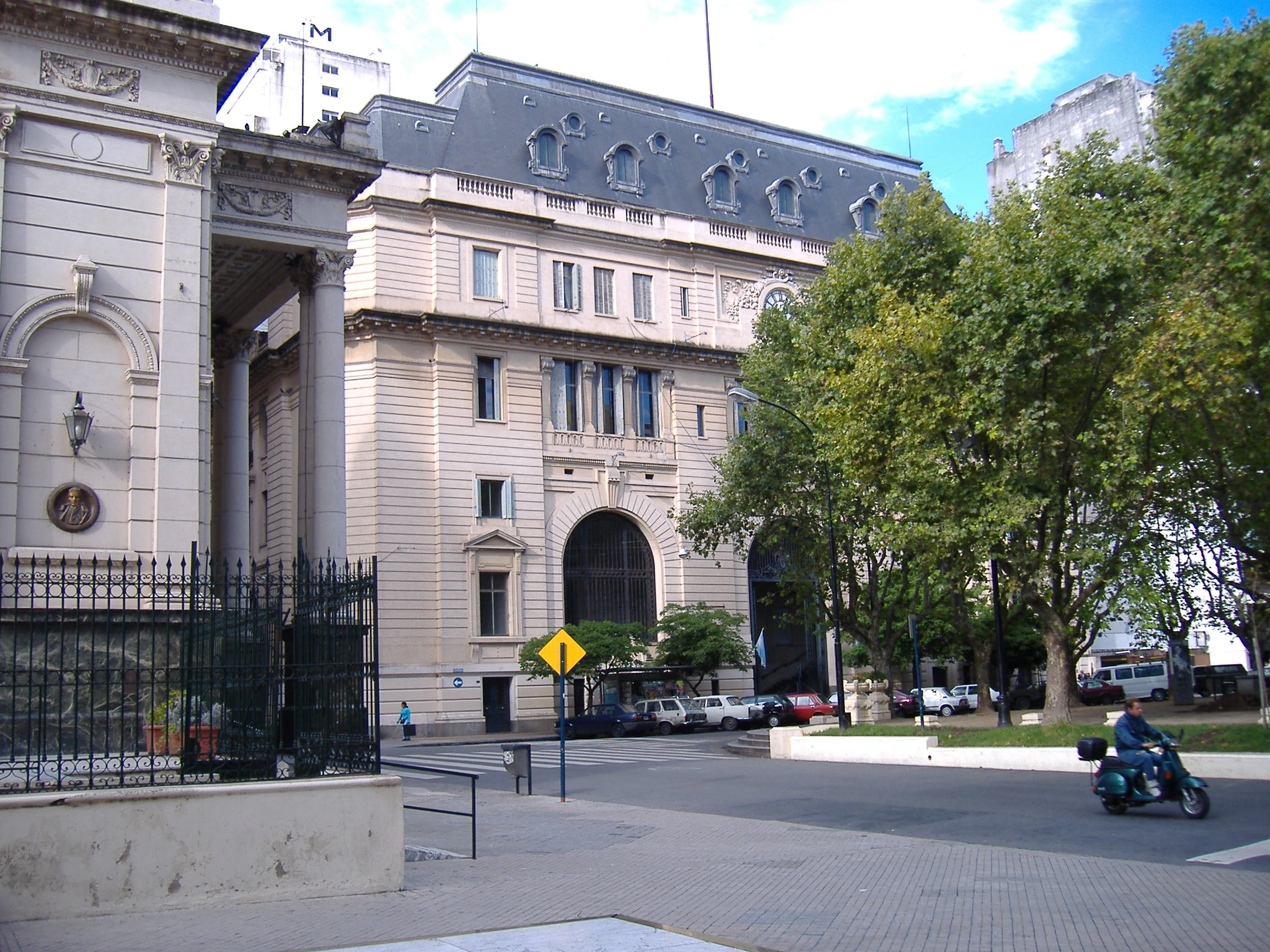
Palacio de Correos de Rosario, Plaza 25 de Mayo, Rosario

Ángel Francisco Guido (1896–1960) was an Argentine architect, engineer and writer.

Guido was educated at the National University of Córdoba and graduated as an architect in 1921. Most of his work is in his home town of Rosario. With fellow architect Alejandro Bustillo, Guido designed the National Flag Memorial of Argentina, circa 1944. The structure was inaugurated in 1957. His other significant designs include

- the Dr. Julio Marc Provincial Historical Museum on the grounds of the Parque de la Independencia in Rosario
- the Palacio de Correos de Rosario in the Plaza 25 de Mayo in Rosario

Guido was awarded a Guggenheim Fellowship in 1932. His daughter was the novelist and screenwriter Beatriz Guido.
