= Leticia Cossettini =

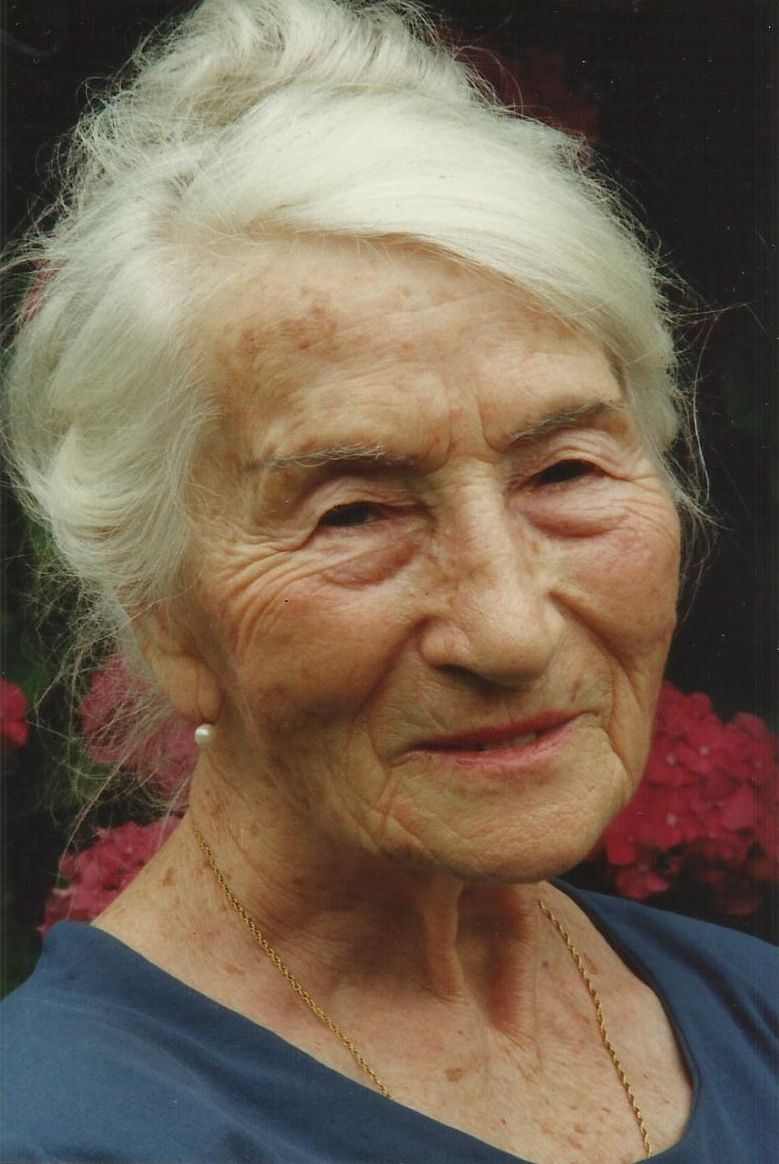
Leticia Cossettini

Leticia Cossettini (May 19, 1904 - December 11, 2004) was an Argentine teacher and pedagogue. She was a Konex Award laureate and was knighted in Italy.

== Biography ==
Leticia Cossettini was born in San Jorge, Santa Fe Province, on May 19, 1904. She was the daughter of Antonio Cossettini and Alpina Bodello, founders of schools in Gálvez. Her sister was Olga Cossettini.

Like her parents and her sister, she followed the career path of an educator. In 1921, she worked as a teacher in a normal school in Rafaela, where she distinguished herself by her sensitivity and her artistic expressions. Between 1935 and 1950, the Cossettini sisters developed a project called Escuela Serena, that they applied at the Experimental School Dr. Gabriel Carrasco in the Barrio Alberdi, city of Rosario. It transformed the traditional school into a more active one with learning experiences based on education criteria.

She died in Rosario, on December 11, 2004. The mayor of the city of Rafaela, Omar Perotti, signed a decree of honor and adherence "to the mourning for the death of Miss Leticia Cossettini."

== Awards and honours ==
In 1985, the Municipality of Rosario recognized Leticia Cossettini as an Illustrious Citizen. In 1986, she received the Konex Award for Humanities as one of the best teachers (without gender distinction) in Argentina. In 1990, the Republic of Italy awarded her the title Cavaliere Ufficiale al Merito.

== Selected publications ==
- 1947, Teatro de Niños
