= Eduardo Barnes =

Argentine sculptor

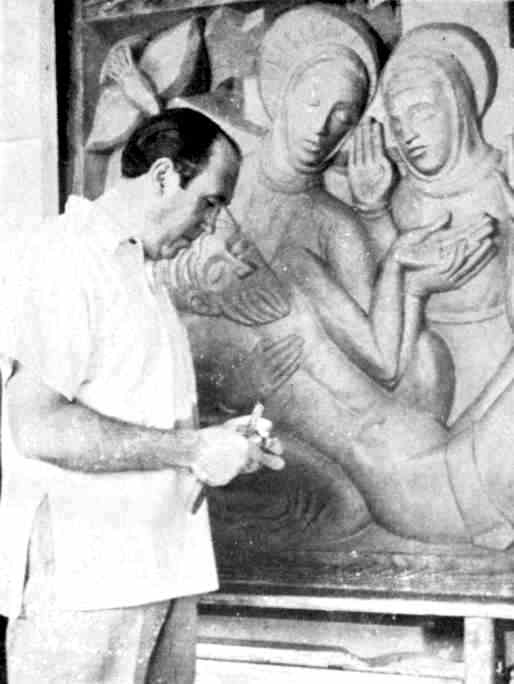
- Born: March 24, 1901; Rosario, Santa Fe
- Died: August 31, 1977 (aged 76); Rosario

Eduardo Amancio Barnes (March 24, 1901 – August 31, 1977) was an Argentine sculptor, and one of his country's preeminent creators of sacred art.

== Life and work ==
Barnes was born in Rosario in 1901. The self-taught sculptor worked with clay, marble, and bronze from early in his career, and by 1939, had created a number of reliefs as part of a series based on the Adoration of the Magi. Barnes would subsequently devote most of his work to religious themes common to Christianity. Collaborating with painter Antonio Berni during the latter's early career, Barnes exhibited his works in cities across the country. The catacombs underneath Rosario's Teatro El Círculo were then converted into the Eduardo Barnes Museum of Sacred Art in 1940.

He would earn a number of awards at the National Fine Arts Salons of Buenos Aires and Rosario, and in 1950, was invited to exhibit at the International Exhibition of Sacred Art in Rome, as well as in the Madrid Biennial of 1952. He created work for the Church of the Sacred Heart in La Plata, for the Somisa steelworkers' community in San Nicolás de los Arroyos, and in the Cathedral of Santa Rosa, La Pampa, among others.

Barnes, however, created much his work in his native Rosario. Some of the most notable included allegorical sculptures for the Cathedral of Our Lady of the Rosary, bas-reliefs representing the blessing of the Argentine flag and General Manuel Belgrano for the National Flag Memorial (1957), a series of 27 reliefs portraying the Via Crucis for the Church of Saint John the Evangelist (1966), and a monument to the founder of the Bank of Santa Fe, Carlos Casado del Alisal (his best known secular work), in 1970.

The noted sculptor taught in his discipline at numerous Rosario schools, serving as Professor of Drawing at the San Martín National College No. 53, in the National Superior School of Commerce, the Bernardino Rivadavia National Girls' High School, as well as Professor of Design at the University of the Littoral School of Architecture. He purchased a vacation home in Tanti, Córdoba, in which he would spend much of his later years, and adorned the entrance with a work titled La Vestal (modeled after his wife). Barnes died in 1977, in Rosario.

== Bibliography ==
- "Arte de la Argentina - El portal de artistas argentinos, museos, salones y principales galerías". www.artedelaargentina.com.ar.
- "El Museo de Arte Sacro Eduardo Barnes, una joya bajo tierra en el Teatro El Círculo – Rosario Por Conocer". www.rosarioporconocer.com.
- IFINRA (2020-06-07). "Eduardo Barnes Medallista". IFINRA (in Spanish).
