= José Fioravanti =

Argentine sculptor

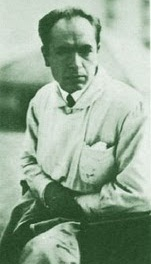
- Born: August 4, 1896; Buenos Aires, Argentina
- Died: October 10, 1977 (aged 81); Buenos Aires. Argentina
- Known for: civic monuments
- Style: sculptor

José Fioravanti (August 4, 1896 – October 10, 1977) was a prolific Argentine sculptor known for the many civic monuments he created.

== Life and work ==
Fioravanti was born in Buenos Aires in 1896. He developed a very early interest in sculpture, and learned the art in the city's numerous private ateliers. The self-taught sculptor first exhibited in 1912 at that year's National Salon, winning the First Prize in his category during the 1919 National Salon for his work, My Sister María.

His work during the next several years consisted mainly of Realist portrait busts created by casting, notably that of former President José Figueroa Alcorta for its placement over the latter's La Recoleta Cemetery crypt. He traveled in Europe from 1924 to 1927 and adopted the method of direct carving, without the use of maquettes. Fioravanti exhibited at the Museum of Modern Art, Madrid, and in the Luxembourg Museum, in Paris.

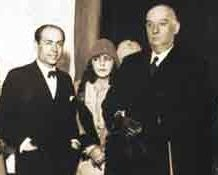
Fioravanti and his wife, Ludvilla, pose with President Marcelo Torcuato de Alvear during a 1928 exhibit. Alvear had the noted sculptor create wall reliefs for the Casa Rosada, whose interiors seemed "cold and denuded."

He then secured two solo exhibitions in Buenos Aires, including a 1928 Friend of the Arts event inaugurated by President Marcelo Torcuato de Alvear, who commissioned Fioravanti to create decorative reliefs for the Casa Rosada's interiors. Fioravanti returned to Paris in 1929. He earned increasing renown in the French capital, and in 1934 was honored with a solo exhibition at the Galerie nationale du Jeu de Paume.

Returning to Argentina in 1935, Fioravanti was appointed Professor at the College of Fine Arts. His portrait of his wife, painter Ludmilla Feodorovna (Woman with Book), earned him a gold medal at the 1936 National Salon. Establishing an atelier in seaside La Lucila del Mar, he created numerous landmark monuments in the ensuing years, including memorials in Buenos Aires to Presidents Nicolás Avellaneda and Roque Sáenz Peña (1935–36), Venezuelan General Simón Bolívar (1942), U.S. President Franklin Roosevelt, as well as two sea lion effigies guarding an esplanade in Mar del Plata (1941), a memorial in Montevideo to Uruguayan General Fructuoso Rivera (1965), and to General Manuel Savio, father of the Argentine steel industry, in Villa María, Córdoba (1969).

Another significant series of Fioravanti's work would adorn the National Flag Memorial, a landmark overlooking the Paraná River in the city of Rosario. The memorial, built between 1947 and 1957, would feature Fioravanti's monument to Manuel Belgrano and five allegorical sculptures; these were created in bronze and travertine. It would be the second significant collaboration with Alfredo Bigatti, who created the allegories representing the Four Freedoms for the Roosevelt memorial.

Fioravanti died in 1977, in Buenos Aires.
