= Government of Rosario =

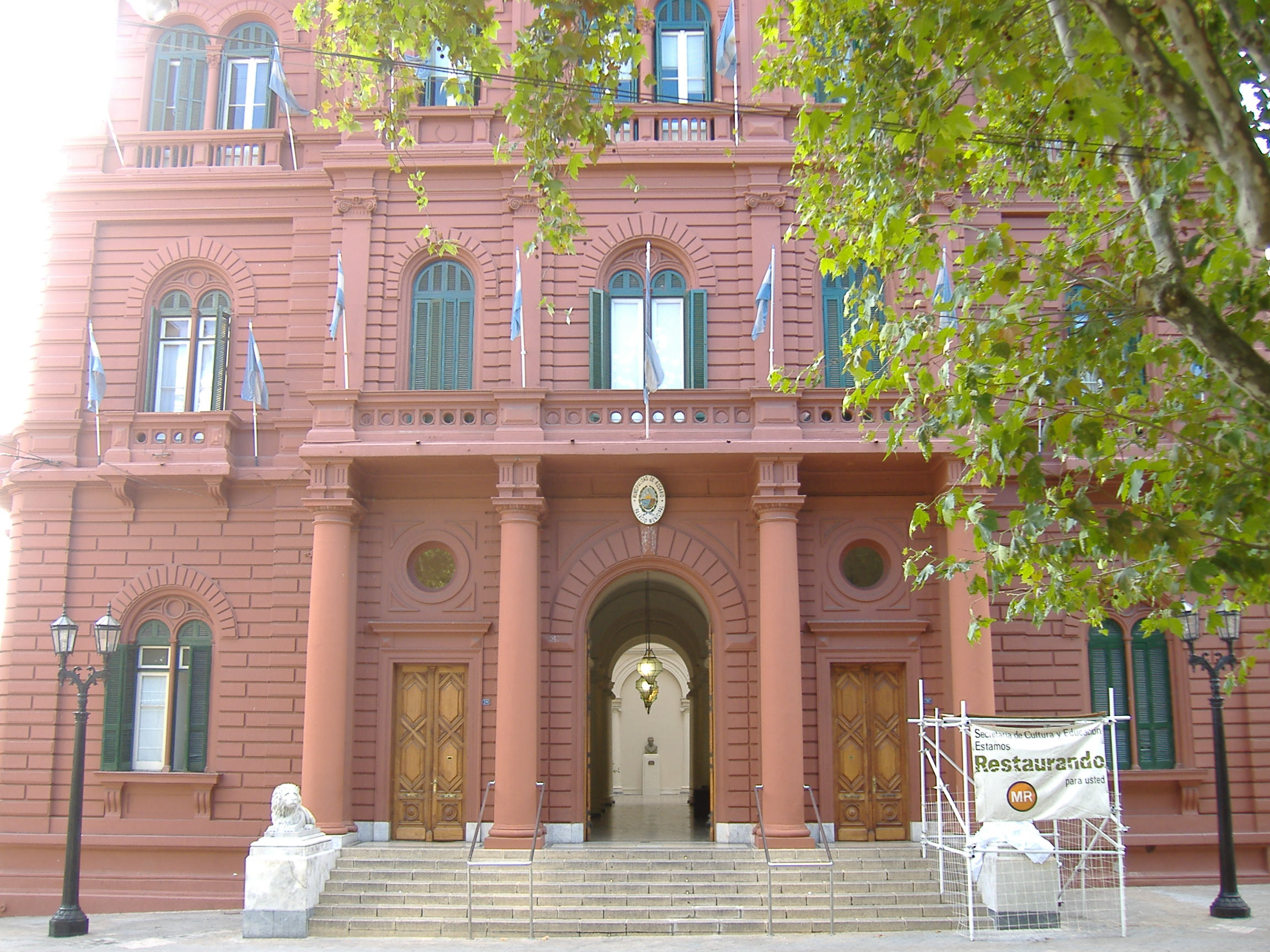
Palacio de los Leones, seat of the Executive Branch of the government of Rosario.

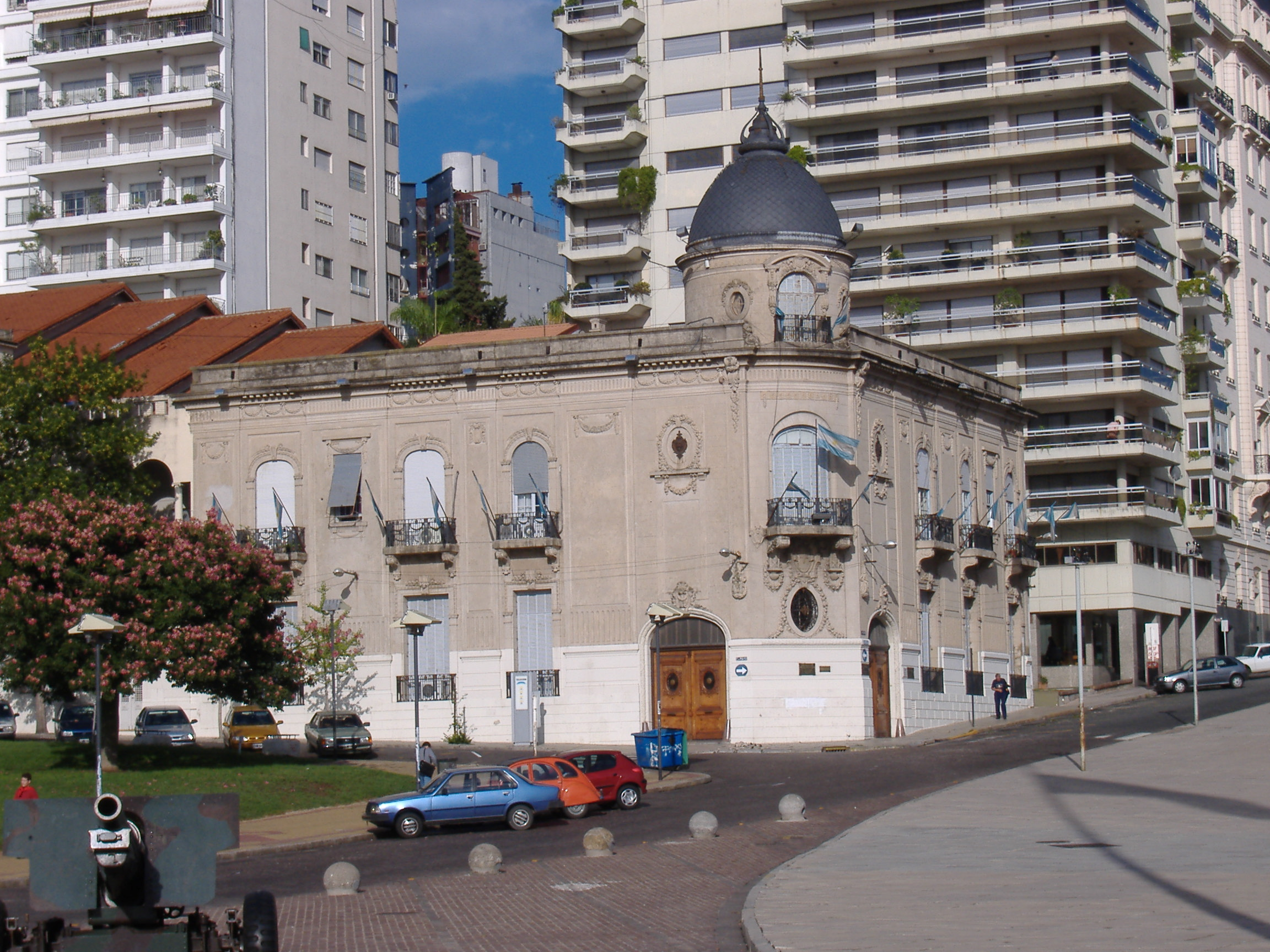
Palacio Vassallo, seat of the Deliberative Council.

This article is about the government of Rosario, the third most populated city in Argentina, and the largest in the province of Santa Fe. Rosario has about 910,000 inhabitants 2001 census [INDEC] and is located on the western shore of the Paraná River.

Rosario is ruled by two branches of government: the Executive, represented by a Mayor (Intendente), and the Legislative, consisting of a Deliberative Council (Concejo Municipal). The status of the city and its form of government are dictated by Santa Fe's Provincial Organic Law of Municipalities (Ley Provincial Nº 2756/39 Orgánica de las Municipalidades), according to which Rosario is a first-category municipality (having more than 200,000 inhabitants).

The Mayor is elected by popular direct vote for a four-year term. He manages several Secretariats in charge of different fields: Government; Finance and Economy; Health; Public Works; Public Services and Environment; Planning; Social Promotion; Culture and Education; Production, Employment Promotion and Foreign Trade; General Secretariat; General Direction of Public Housing Service; General Direction of Social Communication; and the Human Rights Secretariat, established in 2005 and the first of its kind at the municipal level in Argentina. The seat of the Executive branch (Municipalidad) is the Palacio de los Leones, located beside the Cathedral, at the historical core of the city.

The Deliberative Council is in charge of local legislation, passing municipal regulations (ordenanzas). It renews half of its 21 members (Concejales) every two years. It gathers near the Municipality, in its seat at the Palacio Vassallo.

== Mayors of Rosario ==
Since the return to democracy in 1983, the Mayors of Rosario were Horacio Usandizaga (1983–1987, reelected, resigned in 1989), Héctor Cavallero (elected to complete Usandizaga's term, 1989–1991, then reelected 1991–1995), Hermes Binner (1995–1999, reelected, 1999–2003), Miguel Lifschitz (2003–2007, then reelected 2007–2011), and the current one, Mónica Fein (elected in December 2011 until December 2015). Usandizaga was a member of the Radical Party (Unión Cívica Radical in Spanish); he had promised to resign if Carlos Menem was elected President in the national 1989 elections, and he kept his promise. Since then, Rosario's mayors have been members of the Socialist Party, though Cavallero turned to work for the Peronist Party after his last term.

== Urban organization ==
The city is divided into six large administrative districts (Center, North, Northwest, West, Southwest, and South), where Municipal District Centers provide services to the neighbours and organize cultural events.

In December 2003, the United Nations Development Programme (UNDP) bestowed Rosario (chosen among 257 candidate cities) an award for considering it a model of "successful local governance and development experience in Latin America", having achieved a sustained improvement of the citizens' quality of life. Between 25 March and 1 April 2005, following a proposal from the UNDP, Rosario hosted a Fair on Governance (Experiencia Rosario).

== Push for autonomy ==
Local people and institutions are pushing the provincial government for a law, or even a constitutional reform, that grants Rosario the status of Autonomous City, in a manner similar to Buenos Aires. This would allow the city to organize its government independently, to pass laws, to enact its own tax regulations, etc. The idea of municipal autonomy was expounded and elaborated on by Rosario-born politician Lisandro de la Torre in the first years of the 20th century, and incorporated into the Argentine Constitution as part of the 1994 reform.

== Rosario as seat of the National Congress ==
A number of politicians, law experts and prominent locals have also been pursuing the idea of moving the National Congress to Rosario, turning the city into a federal capital along with Buenos Aires, in order to geographically and politically decentralize the national government.

On 22 November 2005, during a regional development forum, the governors of the Center Region (provinces of Santa Fe, Entre Ríos and Córdoba), together with Mayor Miguel Lifschitz and the President of the Board of La Capital newspaper, officially presented the project, which was sent to be studied by the Chamber of Deputies.

Justifications for the move include sparing legislators from the "urban neurosis" of Buenos Aires, the status of Rosario as the country's fastest-growing city and a productive pole, and historical reasons (President Justo José de Urquiza intended Rosario to become the federal capital already in the 19th century).

== The Municipal Urban Guard ==
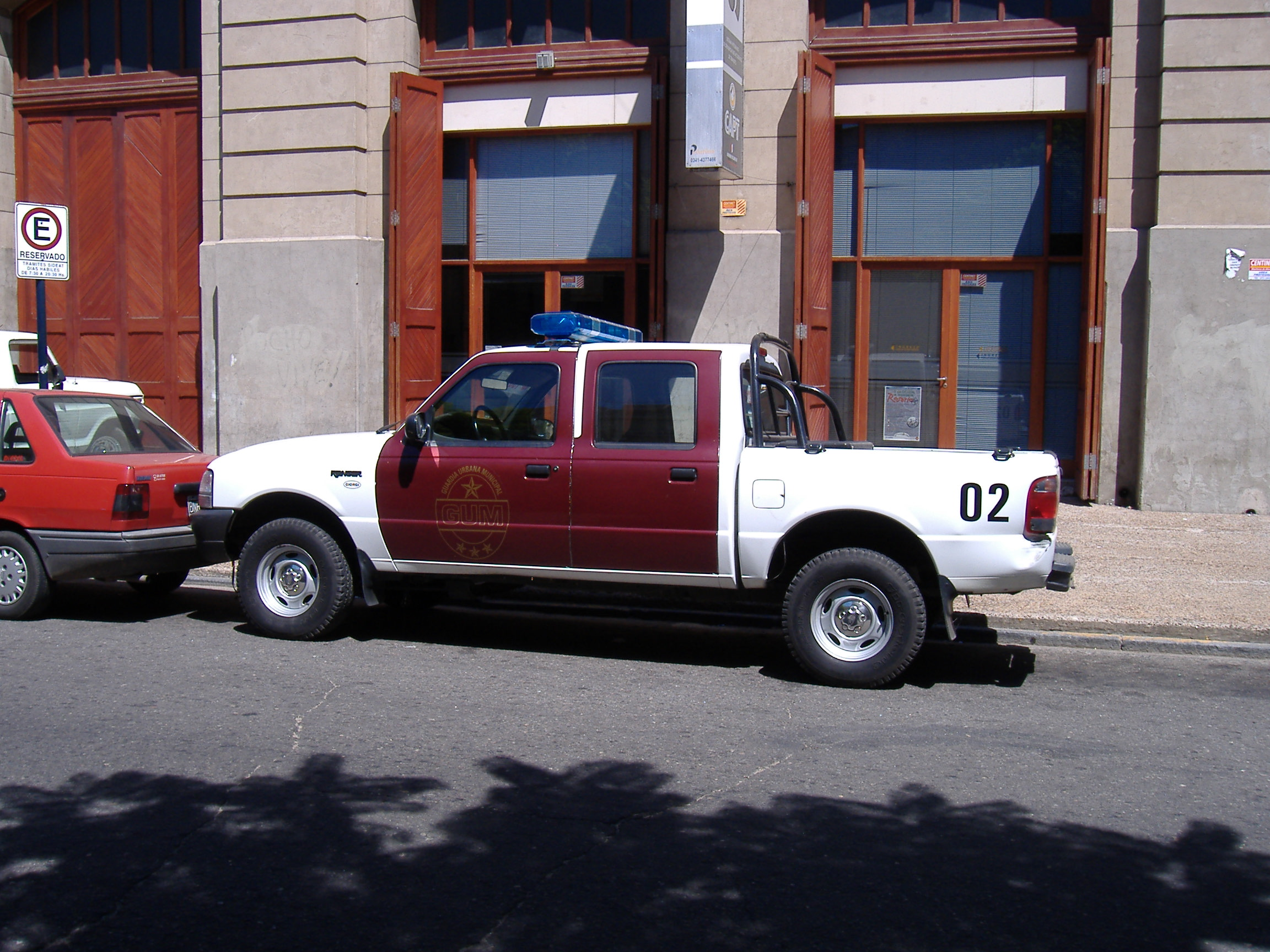
A mobile unit of the GUM

Rosario pioneered the creation of a special force, the Municipal Urban Guard (Guardia Urbana Municipal, GUM) to patrol the city. The GUM agents are not police officers (the police force is under control of the provincial government), so they do not carry weapons and they cannot detain or arrest people, but they can report and record traffic violations, shut down commercial establishments that violate the law, perform first aid procedures, set up roadside blood alcohol content controls, etc. The GUM patrols public areas such as squares, monuments, and the pedestrian streets in the center; its operations overlap and coordinate those of other municipal and provincial agencies, and are intended to have an extra dissuasive effect. The GUM was started on 29 June 2004 with 250 agents, and soon taken up by other cities: in Villa Constitución a project was presented by a private citizen in September; nearby Roldán adopted it in October, Buenos Aires in March 2005 (see Guardia Urbana de Buenos Aires), and Rafaela is currently discussing it. The Police Cadet School of Rosario provided technical courses for aspiring agents residing in many towns and cities of Santa Fe.

== See also ==
- Districts of Rosario
- Government of Argentina
