= Plaza 25 de Mayo (Rosario) =

Coordinates: 32.94712°S 60.633228°W

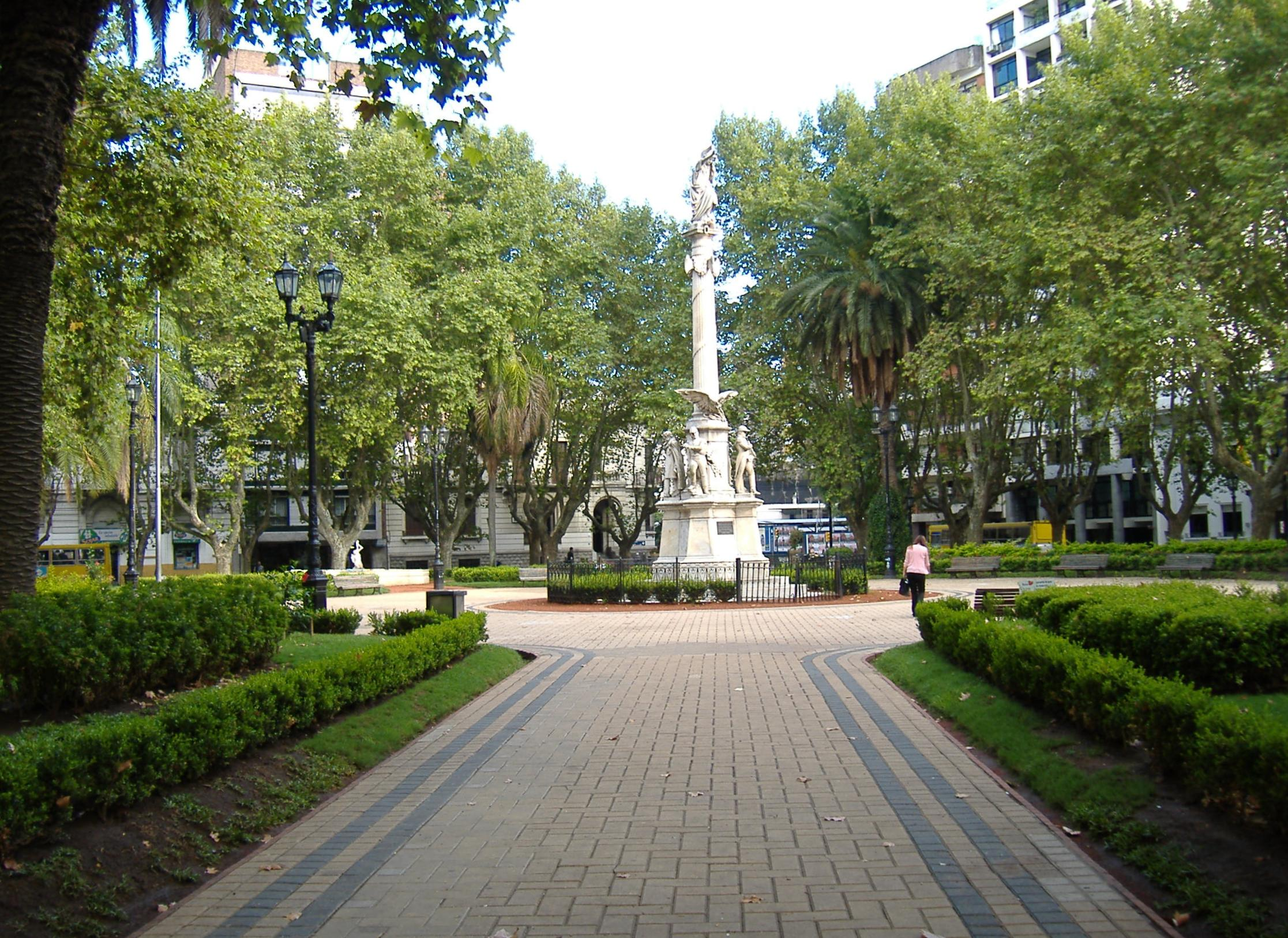
Plaza 25 de Mayo (facing northwest)

Plaza 25 de Mayo ("May 25 Square"; Spanish: [ˈplasa βejntiˈsiŋko ðeˈmaʝo]) is a plaza (urban square) in Rosario, province of Santa Fe, Argentina. It is Rosario's civic center, and the core of the original settlement. Its name alludes to the date (25 May 1810) of the May Revolution, which led to the establishment of the first local Argentine government in Buenos Aires. Before 1852, when this name was adopted, it was simply called Plaza Principal ("Main Square").

Plaza 25 de Mayo is located on the eastern edge of the present-day downtown area, not far from the Paraná River, and occupies the block defined by Santa Fe St., Buenos Aires St., Laprida St. and Córdoba St. East of the plaza lie the seat of the executive branch of Rosario's municipal government, called Palacio de los Leones, and the Basilica Cathedral of Our Lady of the Rosary, seat of the Archdiocese of Rosario. These buildings are separated by a pedestrian passage called Pasaje Juramento, leading to the National Flag Memorial. The Memorial's propylaeum and stone tower can thus be clearly seen from the plaza.

At the center of the plaza there is a monumental column dedicated to national freedom (Columna à la Libertad), with a statue representing Liberty standing on top, and surrounded by the statues of national heroes José de San Martín and Manuel Belgrano, journalist and independence activist Mariano Moreno, and first Argentine president Bernardino Rivadavia. The monument, which dates from 1883, was sculpted by Alejandro Biggi in Carrara marble. Prior to that, since 25 May 1855, its place was occupied by Argentina's first monument to the national constitution of 1853.

== Mothers of the Plaza 25 de Mayo ==
Every Thursday, the Mothers of the Plaza 25 de Mayo, a human rights group named for the plaza, demonstrates in the Plaza 25 de Mayo to call for justice for their children and other victims of forced disappearances during the Dirty War from Santa Fe Province.
