= Olga Cossettini =

Argentine teacher, educator, and pedagogue

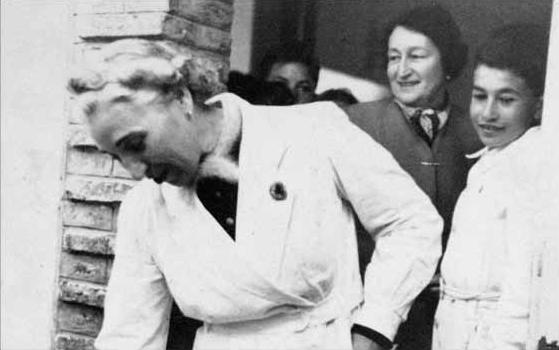
Olga Cossettini

Victoria Olga Cossettini (18 August 1898 - 23 May 1987) was an Argentine teacher, educator, and pedagogue. She spent her career, together with her sister, Leticia Cossettini, transforming traditional schooling.

== Biography ==
Victoria Olga Cossettini was born on 18 August 1898 in San Jorge, Santa Fe Province, Argentina. She graduated from the Normal School of Coronda in Santa Fe. She received a Guggenheim Fellowship in 1941 for a study of elementary and vocational education in the United States.

In 1935, Cossettini created and became a director of the "active school", which was a project she developed with her sister, Leticia (PK). It existed till 1950. In this school the experience was based on incorporating activities such as art, music and acting. Cossettini was also a founder of the School of Higher Teachers, of the Institute of Education Sciences and of the Primary School.

== Death and legacy ==
Cossettini died 23 May 1987, Rosario, Santa Fe, Argentina.

In 1992, five years after her death, the documentary "The School of Miss Olga" was made to commemorate her. Google celebrated her 117th birthday in 2015 with a Google Doodle.

== Awards and honours ==
In 1985, Cossettini was awarded with the title Illustrious Citizen of the City of Rosario in Santa Fe.

== Selected works ==
- "Escuela serena" (1935)
- "Escuela viva" (1939)
- "El niño, su expresión" (1940)
- "Adult education in England"(1965).
