= Barrio Alberdi =

Neighborhood of Rosario, Argentina

Coordinates: 32.894°S 60.692°W

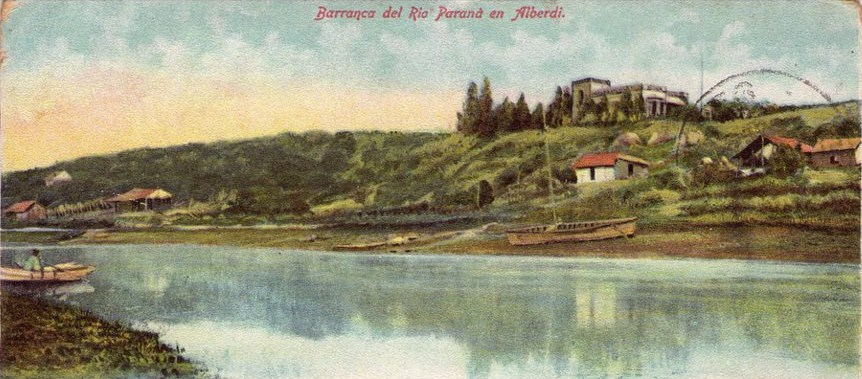

Alberdi is a primarily residential barrio (traditional neighborhood) of Rosario, Argentina. It is located in the north-east of the city, between Rondeau Boulevard and the Paraná River. In the current administrative division system employed by the municipality, it belongs in the North District.

It was founded in 1876. This barrio was initially an independent town (Pueblo Alberdi) and was then annexed to Rosario in 1918. It is an upper-middle-class neighborhood and has a number of mansions built at the beginning of the 20th century, including Villa Hortensia (refurbished to serve as a Municipal District Center).
