= Alfredo Rouillon =

Argentinian businessman and politician (1875–1951)

- Born: Alfredo Rouillón; Rosario, Argentina
- Died: Rosario, Argentina
- Occupations: Entrepreneur, businessman, politician

Alfredo J. Rouillon (1875–1951) was an entrepreneur, businessman and politician from Rosario, Santa Fe, Argentina. He served as mayor of Rosario from 1922 to 1923.

He was the son of Bernardo Rouillon and Magdalena Vierci. Due to the early death of his father, he was educated in Switzerland.

In 1901 he married Maria Hortensia Echesortu, with whom he had nine children: Alfredo, Armando, Hortensia, Guillermo, Fernando, Stella, Elena, Ernesto, and Jorge .

His usual residence was in Moreno and Cordoba in downtown Rosario, Villa Hortensia was the family summer residence.

He served as mayor of Rosario, councilor, president of numerous commercial companies, founder of several clubs in the city of Rosario like the Jockey Club, the Club Rosarino de pelota, pioneer of aviation and communications in Argentina. He was also president of the Argentine Patriotic League, Rosario section.

During his tenure as Mayor of Rosario his friend Santos Dumont landed his airplane in the city.
