= National Flag Memorial (Argentina) =

- Monumento a la Bandera (Spanish)
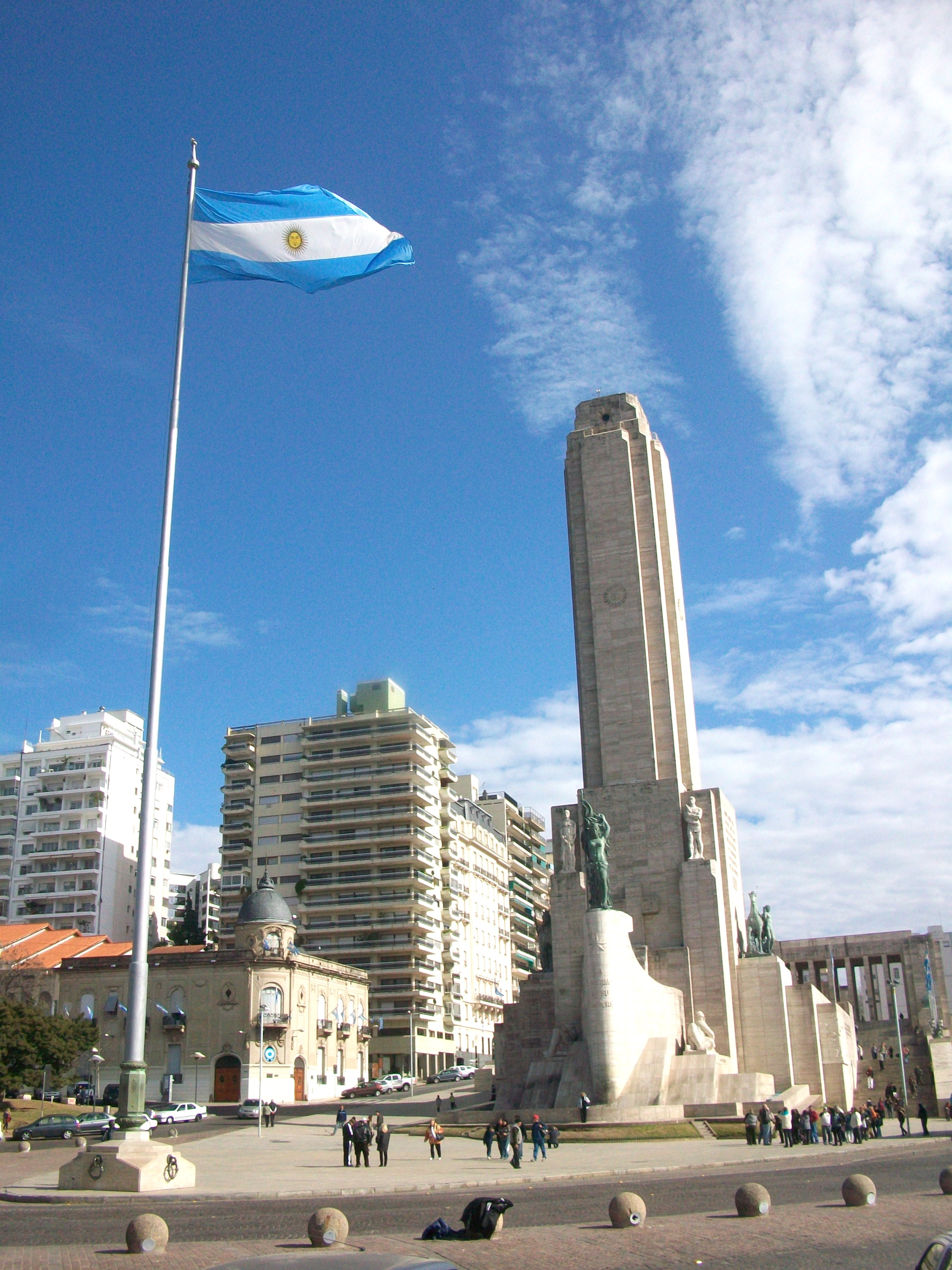
- The monument in 2010

- Location within Argentina
- 32°56′52.4400″S 60°37′47.1072″W
- Location: Rosario, Argentina

History
- Built: 1957; 69 years ago
- Built for: National flag of Argentina

Site notes
- Architect(s): Alejandro Bustillo; Ángel Guido
- Website: monumentoalabandera.gob.ar

The National Flag Memorial (Spanish, Monumento a la Bandera) in Rosario, Argentina, is a monumental complex built near the shore of the Paraná River. It was inaugurated on June 20, 1957, the anniversary of the death of Manuel Belgrano, creator of the Argentine flag, who raised it for the first time on an island on the opposite shore of the river on February 27, 1812.

The complex has a total area of about 10,000 square metres, and was built mostly using stone from the Andes, under the direction of architects Ángel Guido and Alejandro Bustillo, and the sculptors José Fioravanti, Alfredo Bigatti and Eduardo Barnes.

The Monumento has three parts: the Tower (Torre) or mast, 70 metres high, which commemorates the Revolution of May 1810 and houses Manuel Belgrano's crypt in its base; the Civic Courtyard (Patio Cívico), which symbolizes the effort of the organization of the state (the Courtyard is used for massive open-air shows), and the Triumphal Propylaeum (Propileo Triunfal), representing the Nation as organized after the 1853 Constitution. Under the Propylaeum there is the Honour Room for the Flags of America (where the flags of all American nations are displayed).

The complex faces Belgrano Avenue, and is delimited by Córdoba St. and Santa Fe St., which slope down towards the river at this point. The Propylaeum can be accessed from the pedestrian passage called Pasaje Juramento ("Oath Passage"), which starts at Buenos Aires St. between the municipal building (Palacio de los Leones) and the Cathedral, in front of Plaza 25 de Mayo (May 25th Square). The passage is flanked by statues by famous sculptor Lola Mora.

== Celebrations and Events ==
The Memorial and the National Flag Park located in front of it are the seat of the main celebrations of Flag Day on June 20. The 50th anniversary of the inauguration of the complex, in 2007, was marked by a special celebration and by the unveiling of a new lighting system.

One flag pole at the memorial is usually kept empty and is used to celebrate the national holidays of other nations, particularly those that have a substantial immigrant population in Argentina, examples include Japan's National Foundation Day, Italy's Festa della Repubblica, or Saint Patrick's Day for Ireland.

== Tourism ==
According to the Travelers Choice Awards 2013, granted by the Tripavisor site based on the votes of the people, the National Monument to La Bandera ranks number 20 among the 25 places of interest to visit in South America.

== Gallery ==
Fountain

Front view

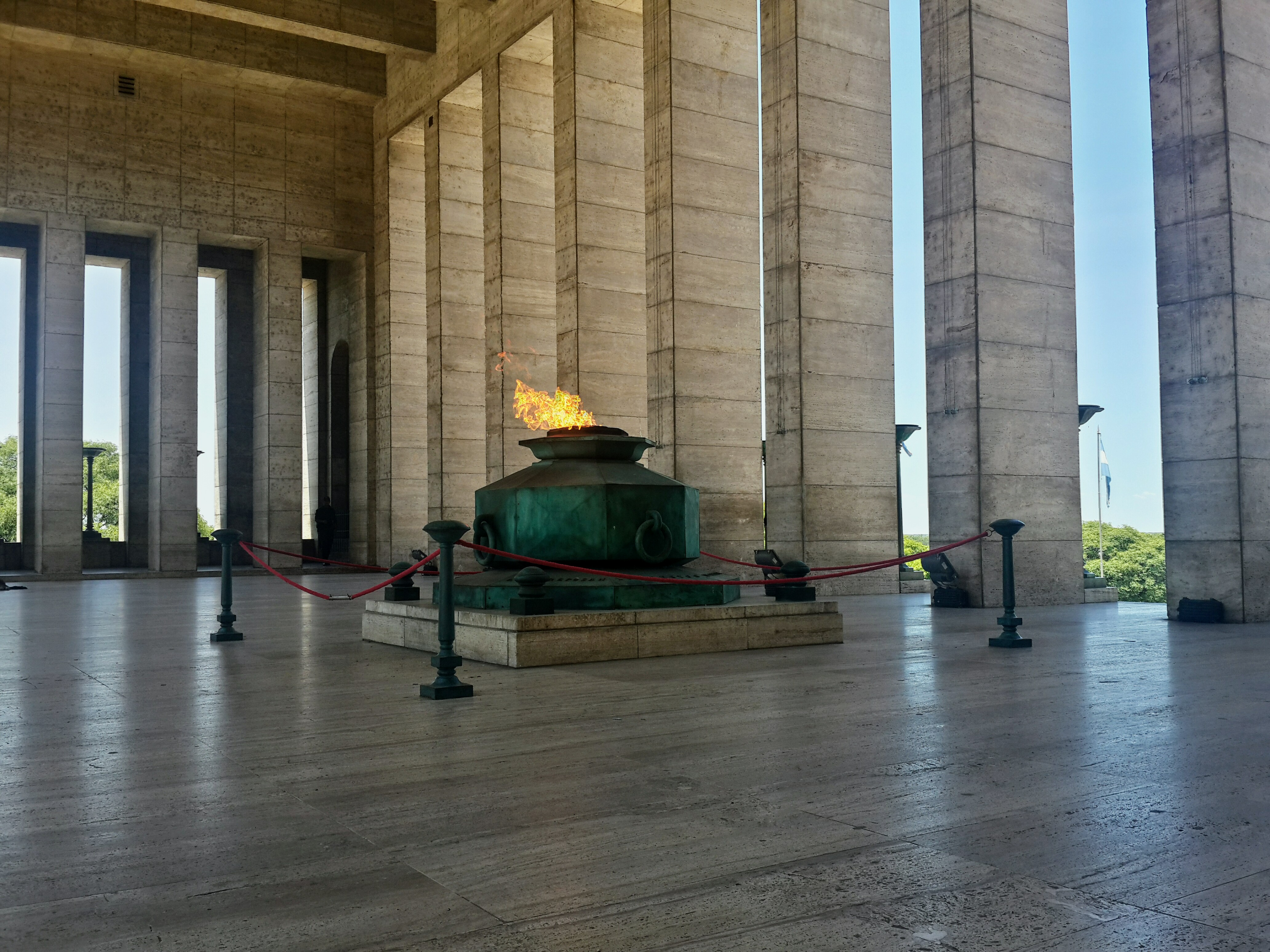
The eternal flame

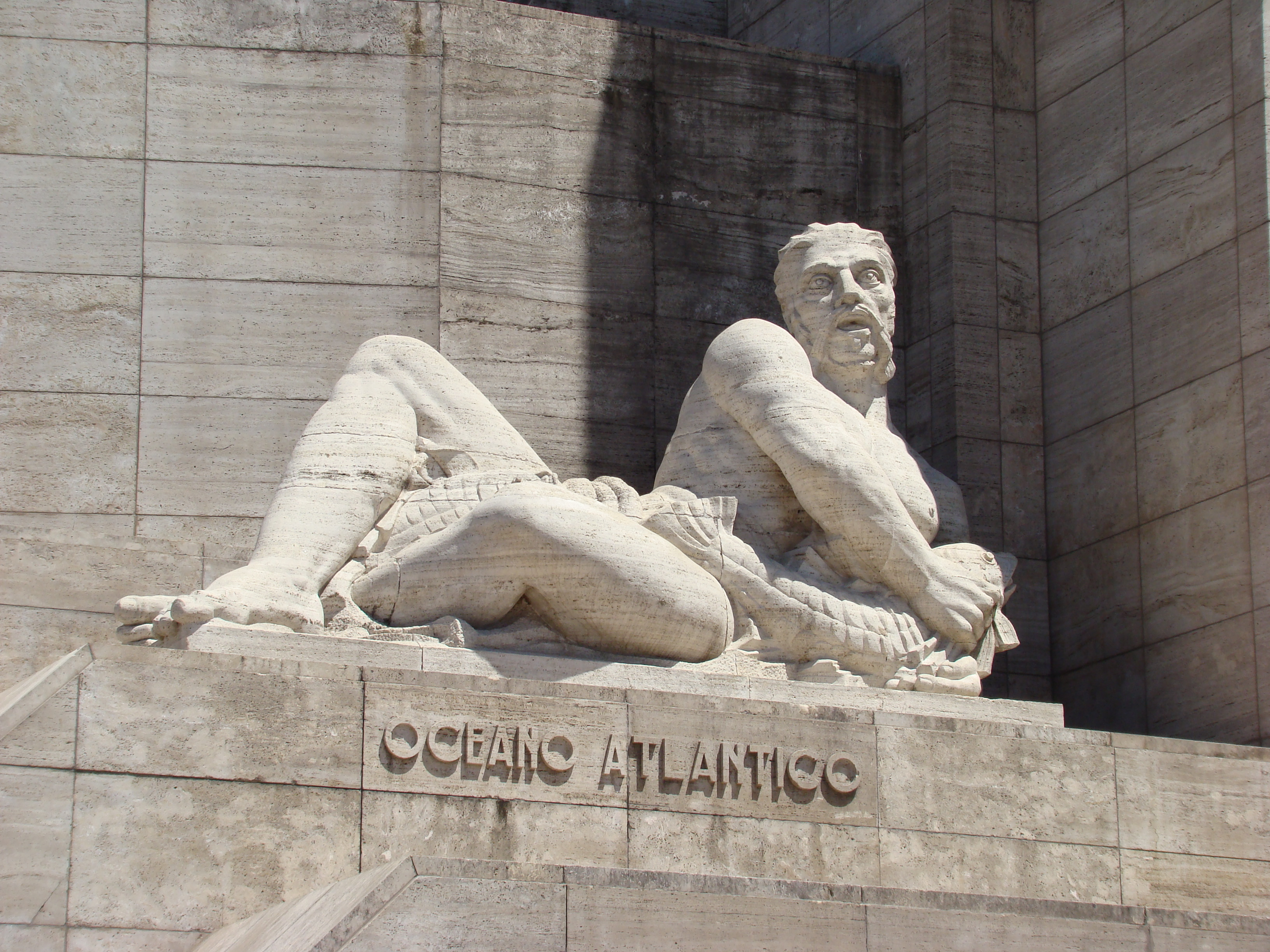
Atlantic Ocean allegory

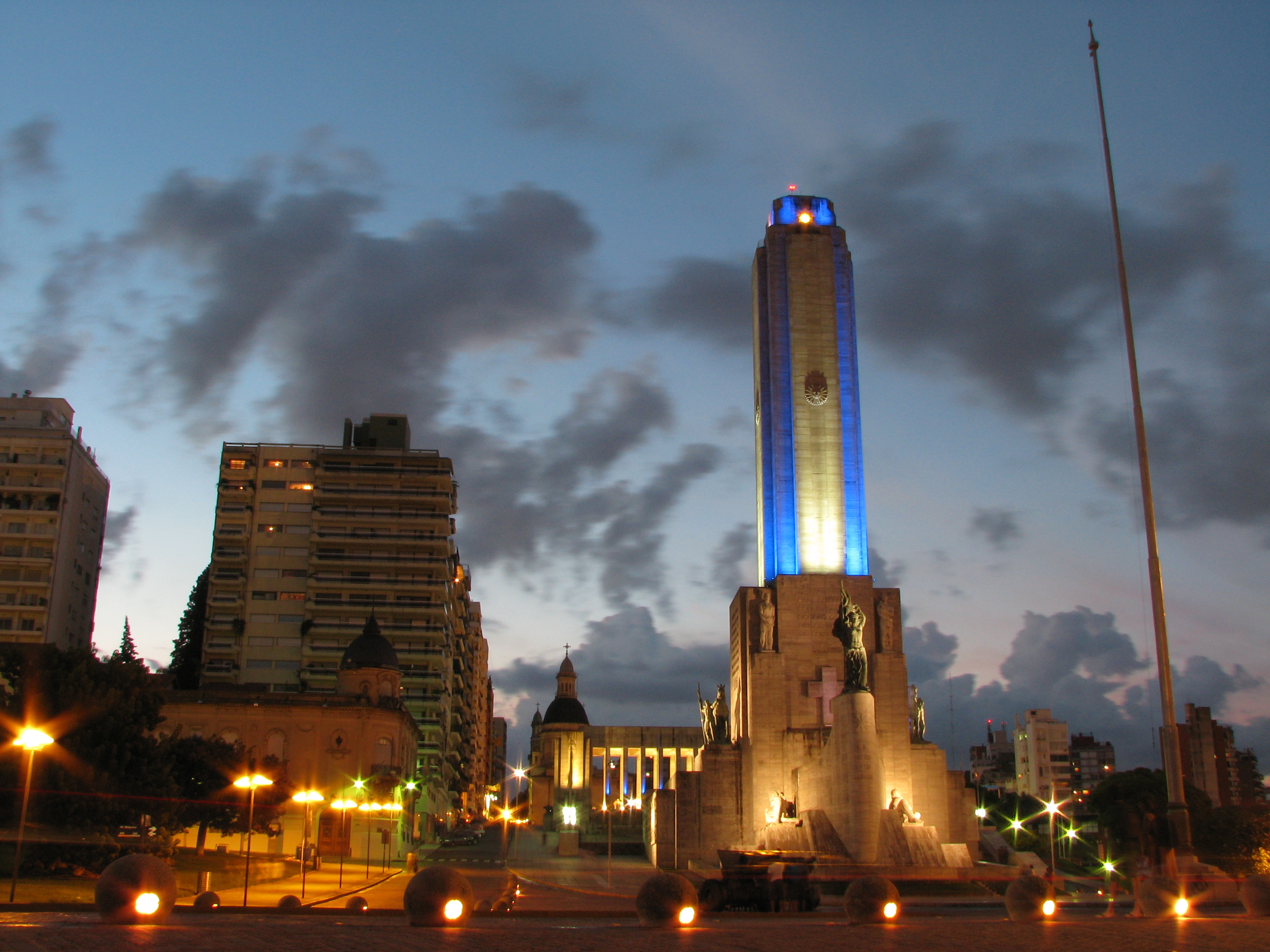
The monument at night

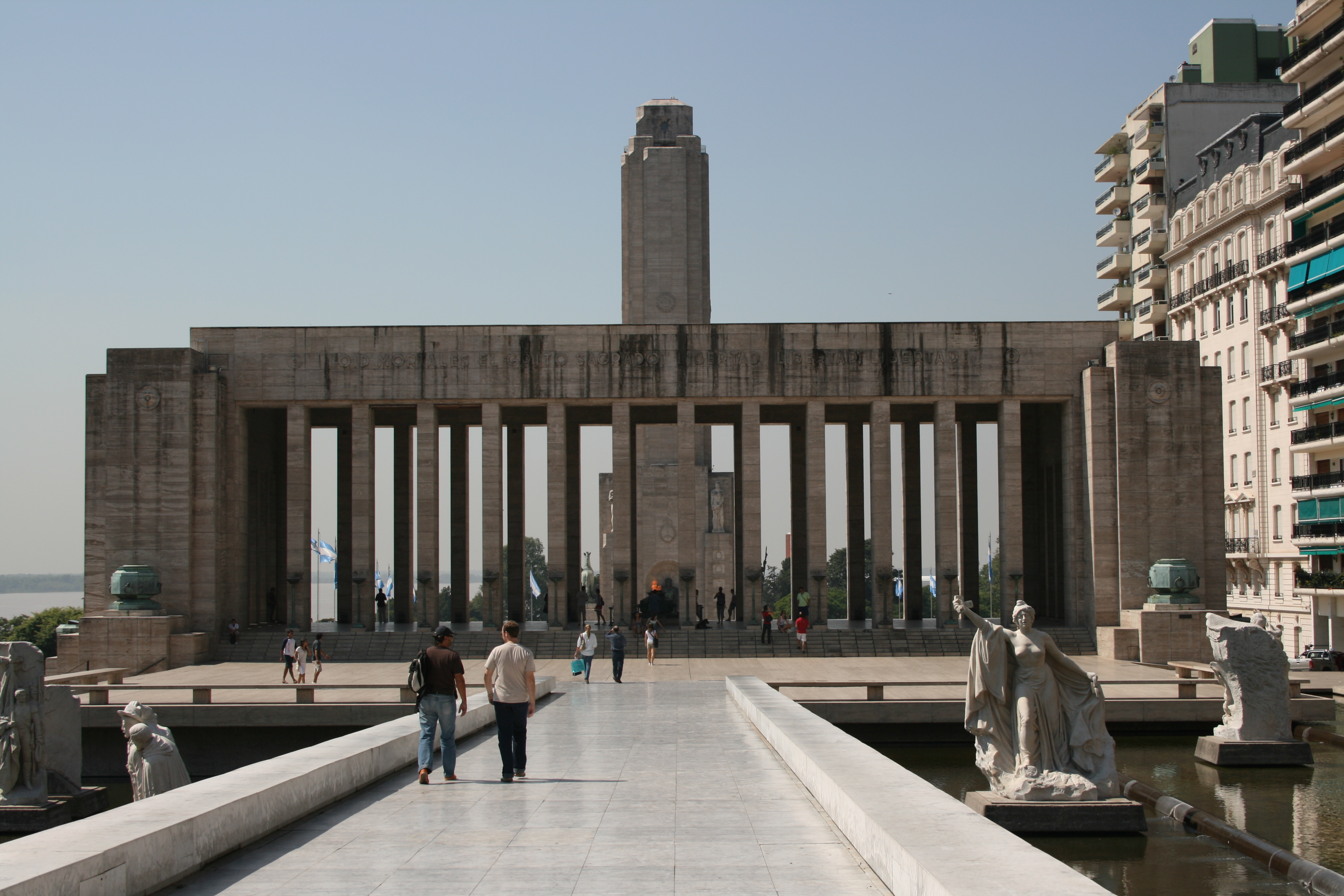
The propylaeum

Flags at the monument

Statue

Back view

National coat

Manuel Belgrano's sabre

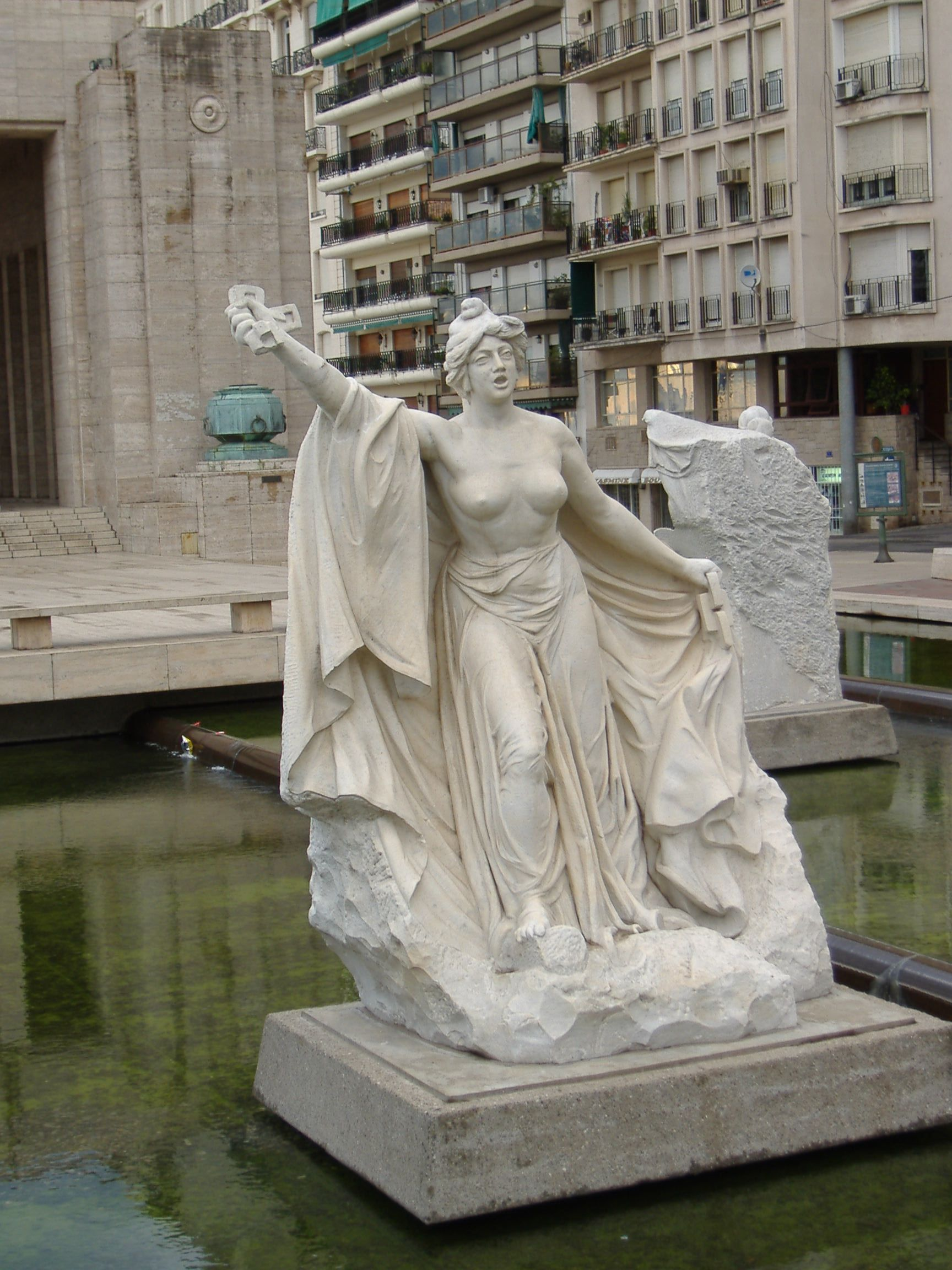
Scultpure by Lola Mora

Carved statues

== See also ==
- Flag of Argentina
- Manuel Belgrano
- List of buildings
- List of National Historic Monuments of Argentina
