= Elsa Massa =

Argentine human rights activist (c.1929–2018)

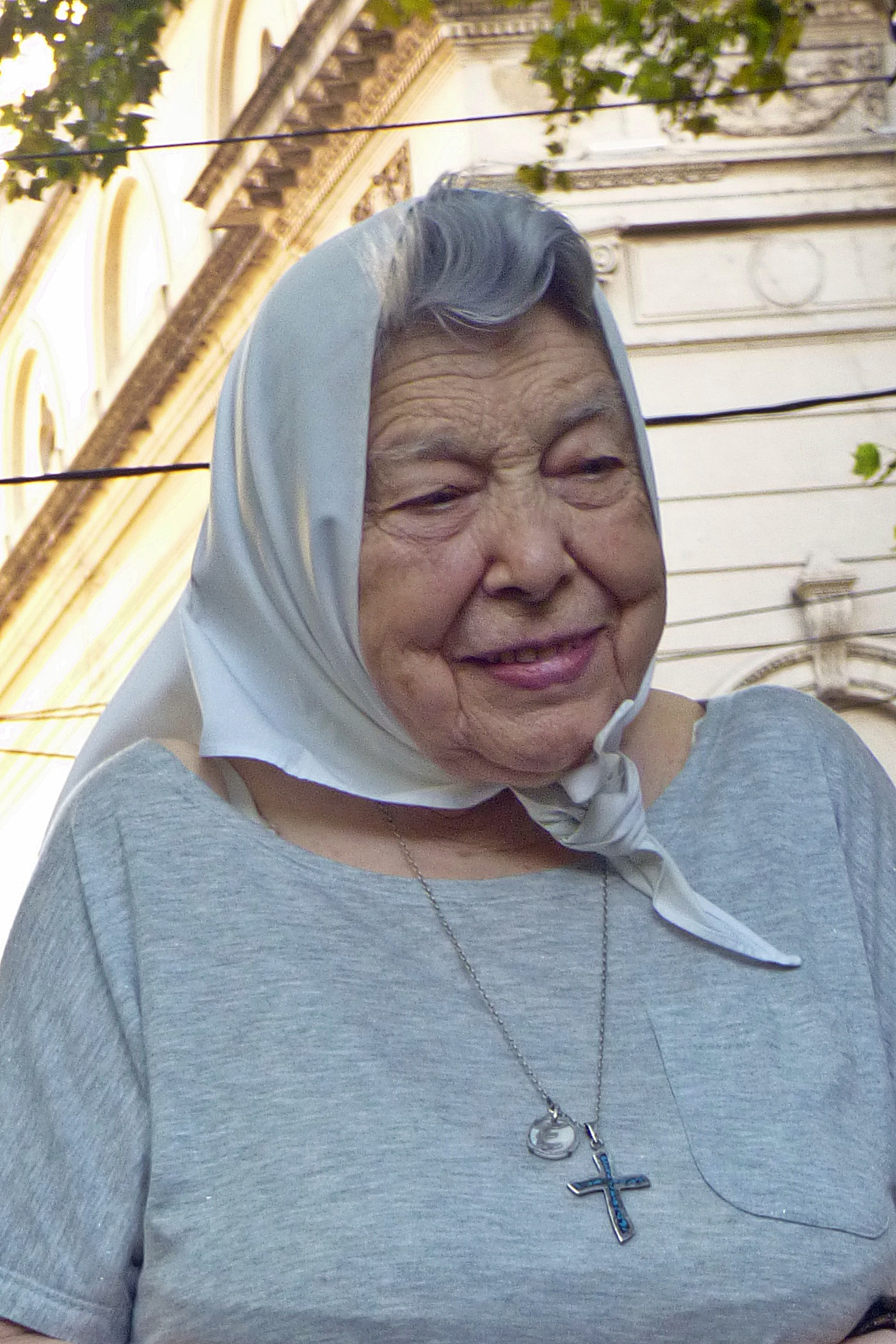
- Born: c. 1929
- Died: June 21, 2018
- Occupation: Human rights activist

Elsa Massa (c. 1929 - June 21, 2018) was an Argentine human rights activist. She became a Mother of the Plaza de Mayo after her son, Ricardo Massa, who was a 30 year old doctor, was abducted on August 26, 1977 in Rosario by the Argentine Anticommunist Alliance because of his support for Juan Perón. Elsa was 92 years old when she died.
