= Adela Forestello =

Argentine educator and human rights activist (1923–2021)

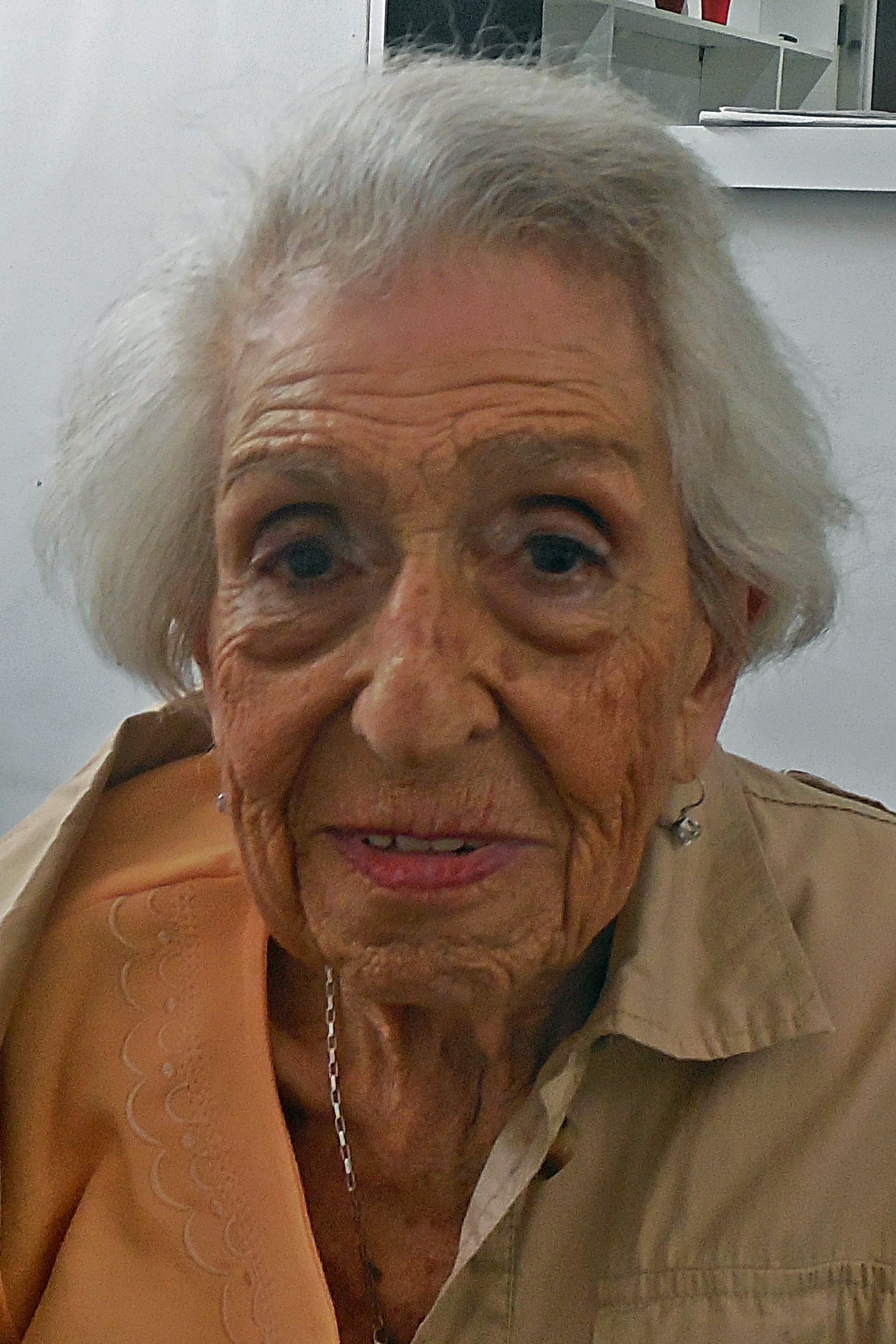
- Adela "Lila" Forestello in 2017
- Born: 31 January 1923; Posadas, Misiones Province, Argentina
- Died: 11 August 2021 (aged 98); Rosario, Santa Fe Province, Argentina
- Occupation: Human Rights Activist
- Spouse: Domingo Forestello (died 1976)
- Children: 2

Adela "Lila" Panelo de Forestello (31 January 1923 – 11 August 2021) was an Argentine human rights activist and retired mathematics teacher. Forestello was a founding member of the Mothers of the Plaza 25 de Mayo, based in Rosario, Santa Fe Province. She joined with other women in Rosario to establish the Mothers of the Plaza 25 de Mayo following the forced disappearance of their children during the Dirty War and military dictatorship from 1976 to 1983. Her daughter, Marta María "Lala" Forestello, was kidnapped on August 19, 1977, and remains missing to this day.

Forestello spent the rest of her life seeking answers to the kidnapping and campaigning for justice and the prosecution of those responsible for the forced disappearances and murders. She was the only member of the Mothers of the Plaza 25 de Mayo to testify during the 2009 federal Guerrieri I Trial, which led to the conviction of several perpetrators for crimes against humanity in April 2010.

Forestello was the last surviving original, founding member of the Mothers of the Plaza 25 de Mayo at the time of her death in 2021.

== Biography ==
Forestello was born in Posadas, Misiones Province, on 31 January 1923. She moved to the city of Rosario when she was 13-years old. Forestello taught mathematics at Normal School No. 1 in Rosario during her teaching career. She was married to the late Domingo Forestello (1917-1976), a dentist, with whom she had two daughters, María Susana and Marta María "Lala" Forestello.

Forestello's youngest daughter, Marta María Forestello, was a statistics student at the National University of Rosario during the late 1970s and a member of the Montoneros, a left-wing peronist guerrilla organization opposed to the National Reorganization Process military dictatorship. Marta Forestello, who was 24 years old, and her one-year old daughter, Victoria, were kidnapped on August 19, 1977. Soon after her arrest, Marta Forestello was transferred to the custody of the Servicio de Informaciones and imprisoned in the notorious Quinta de Funes, Escuela técnica Osvaldo Magnasco de Rosario, and La Intermedia de Timbúes clandestine detention centers. She disappeared during her detention during the Dirty War and has never been seen again. Adela Forestello, spent the next two weeks trying to locate her one-year old granddaughter, Victoria, who had also been kidnapped. She managed to locate Victoria fifteen days after her kidnapping at a juvenile police facility. Forestello found her granddaughter in poor condition with lice and wearing unchanged diapers. Less than one month later, Adela Forestello's son-in-law and husband of Marta, Miguel Ángel Tosetti, was also kidnapped in September 1977. He was last seem alive at the Quinta de Funes prison. Adella Forestello raised her granddaughter after the forced disappearances of her daughter and son-in-law.

In 1982, Forestello joined with other mothers to form the Mothers of the Plaza 25 de Mayo, based in Rosario, Santa Fe Province. The organization seeks to located missing their children who went missing in Rosario during the Dirty War and bring the perpetrators to justice.

Adela Forestello became the last living, founding member of the Mothers of the Plaza 25 de Mayo following the death of Noemí Johnston de De Vicenzo in July 2021. A few weeks later, Forestello died in Rosario on 11 August 2021, at the age of 97.
