= Cathedral Basilica of Our Lady of the Rosary, Rosario =

Roman Catholic cathedral in Rosario, Argentina

Coordinates: 32°56′51.29″S 60°37′55.49″W

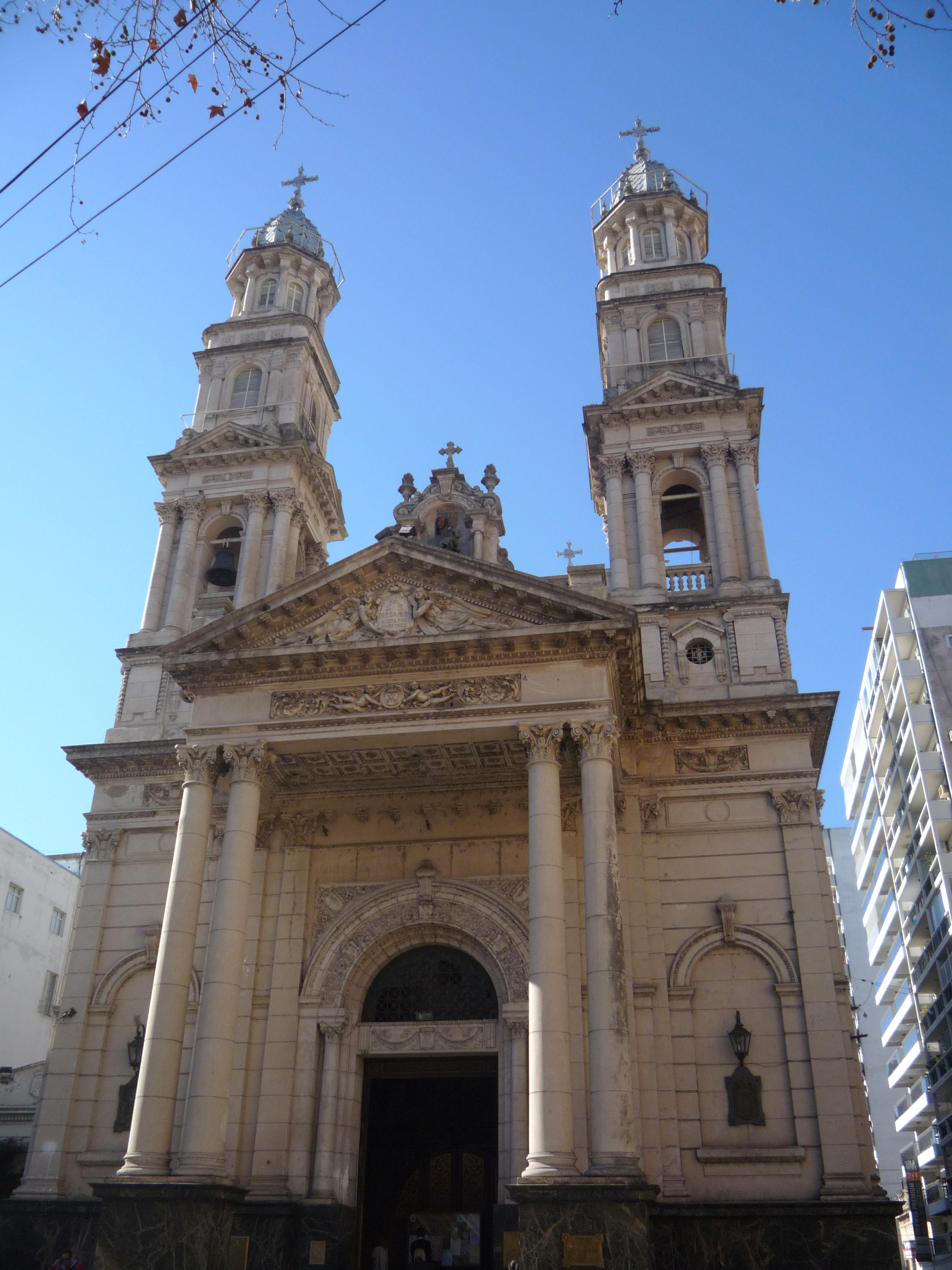
The Cathedral of Rosario

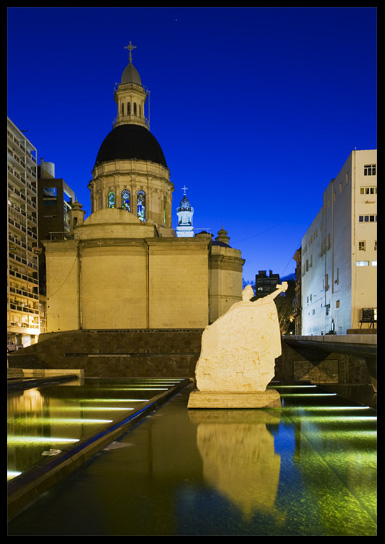
The Cathedral viewed from behind

The Cathedral Basilica Shrine of Our Lady of the Rosary is a minor basilica and cathedral dedicated to the local Virgin of the Rosary, in the city of Rosario, province of Santa Fe, Argentina. It is the mother church of the Archdiocese of Rosario.

The basilica is located on the oldest part of the city, at the corner of Buenos Aires St. and Córdoba St., besides the Palacio de los Leones (that is, the municipal building), across the pedestrian path called Pasaje Juramento ("Oath Passage") that leads into the National Flag Memorial. The basilica faces Plaza 25 de Mayo (May 25th Square), also bordered by the Central Post Office.

The first parish was built in this site in 1731, at a time when Rosario was no more than a small scattered village on the shore of the Paraná River. The image of the Virgin of the Rosary was brought from Cádiz, Spain, in 1773.

The basilica dates from the last part of the 19th century; it was first projected in 1882 and its construction started in 1887. Its altar is of Italian origin, and it was made of Carrara marble. The mother church was officially named a cathedral at the canonical erection of the Diocese of Rosario, on 20 April 1934, and it became a basilica on 7 October 1966.

== See also ==
- Roman Catholic Marian churches
