= Palacio de los Leones =

Municipal building in Rosario, Argentina

Coordinates: 32°56′50″S 60°37′56″W

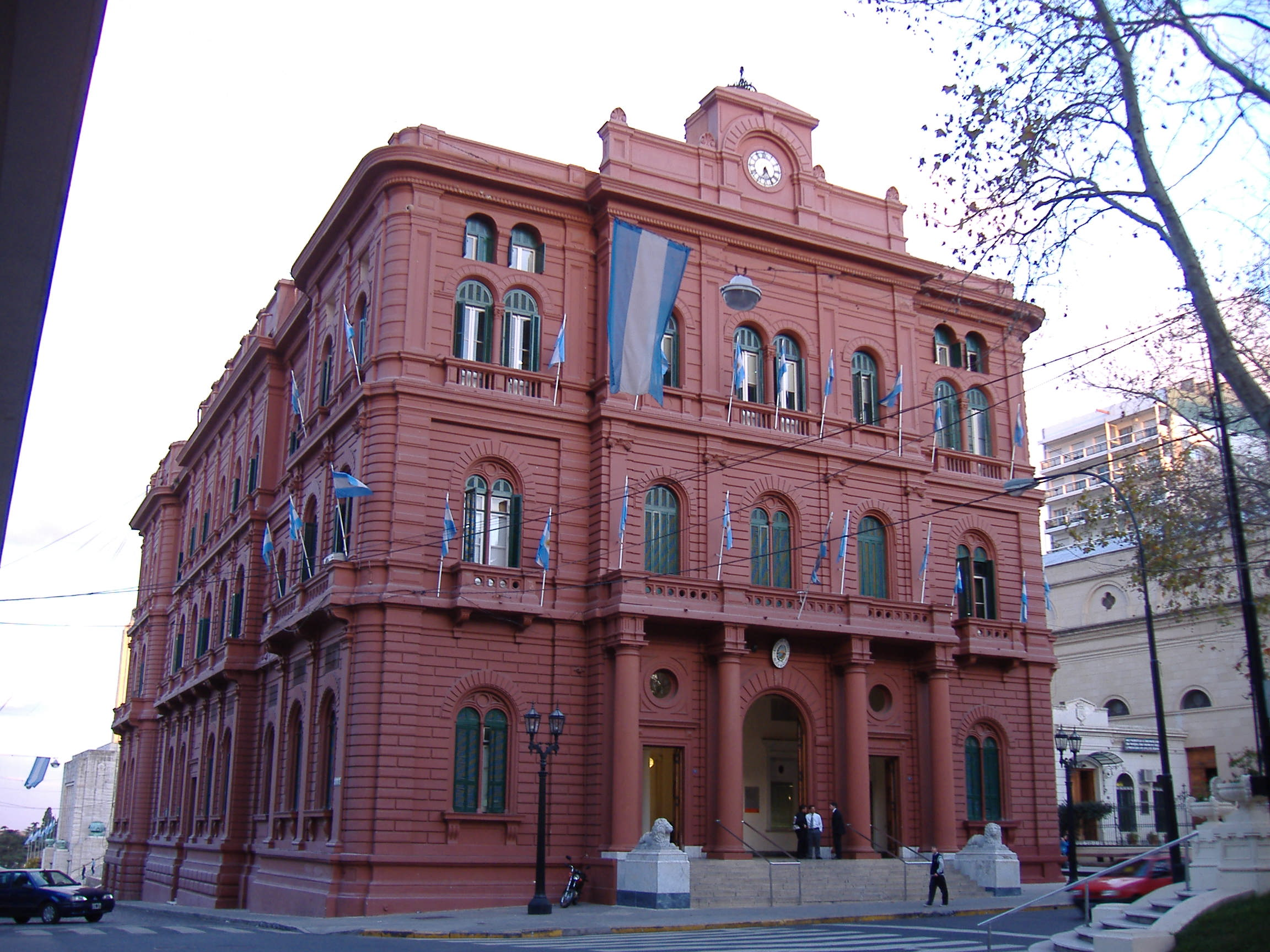
Palacio de los Leones

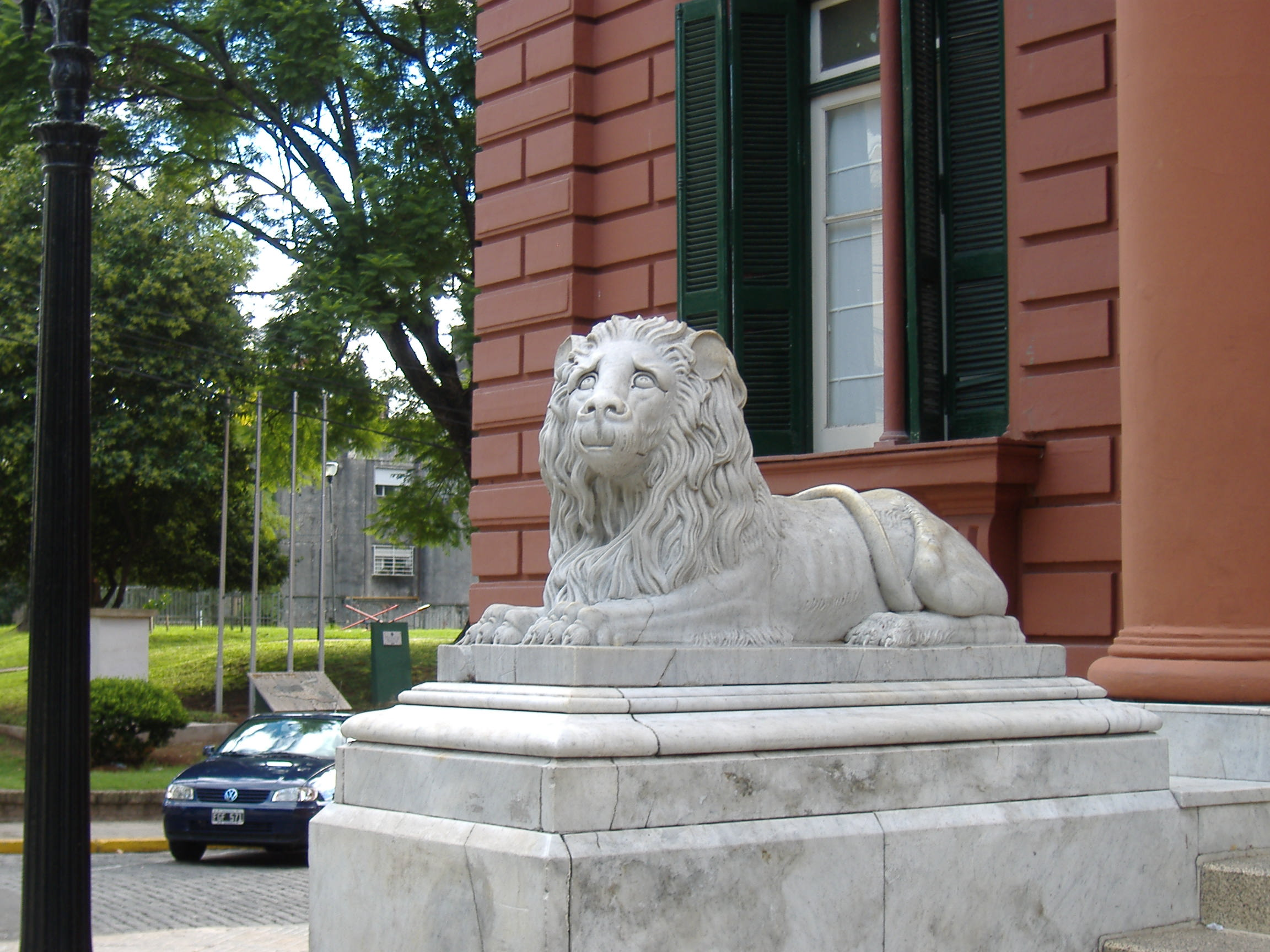
A close-up of the left-side lion

Palacio de los Leones (Spanish, Palace of the Lions) is the name of the main municipal building of the city of Rosario, Argentina. The Palace is the seat of the executive branch of the municipal government. It is located at the corner of Buenos Aires and Santa Fe Streets, in front of Plaza 25 de Mayo (May 25 Square), and separated from the Cathedral by the promenade known as Pasaje Juramento (Oath Passage), which leads to the National Flag Memorial.

The palace was built by architect Gaetano Rezzara, in a neo-Renaissance style, and was inaugurated in 1898. Its name comes from the two lions that flank the stairway leading to the main door, which are copies of the ones found on the steps of the Cathedral of St. Lawrence in Genoa, Italy. The building is painted reddish brown (terra cotta or pale carmine), and the two lions are white.
