= History of Rosario =

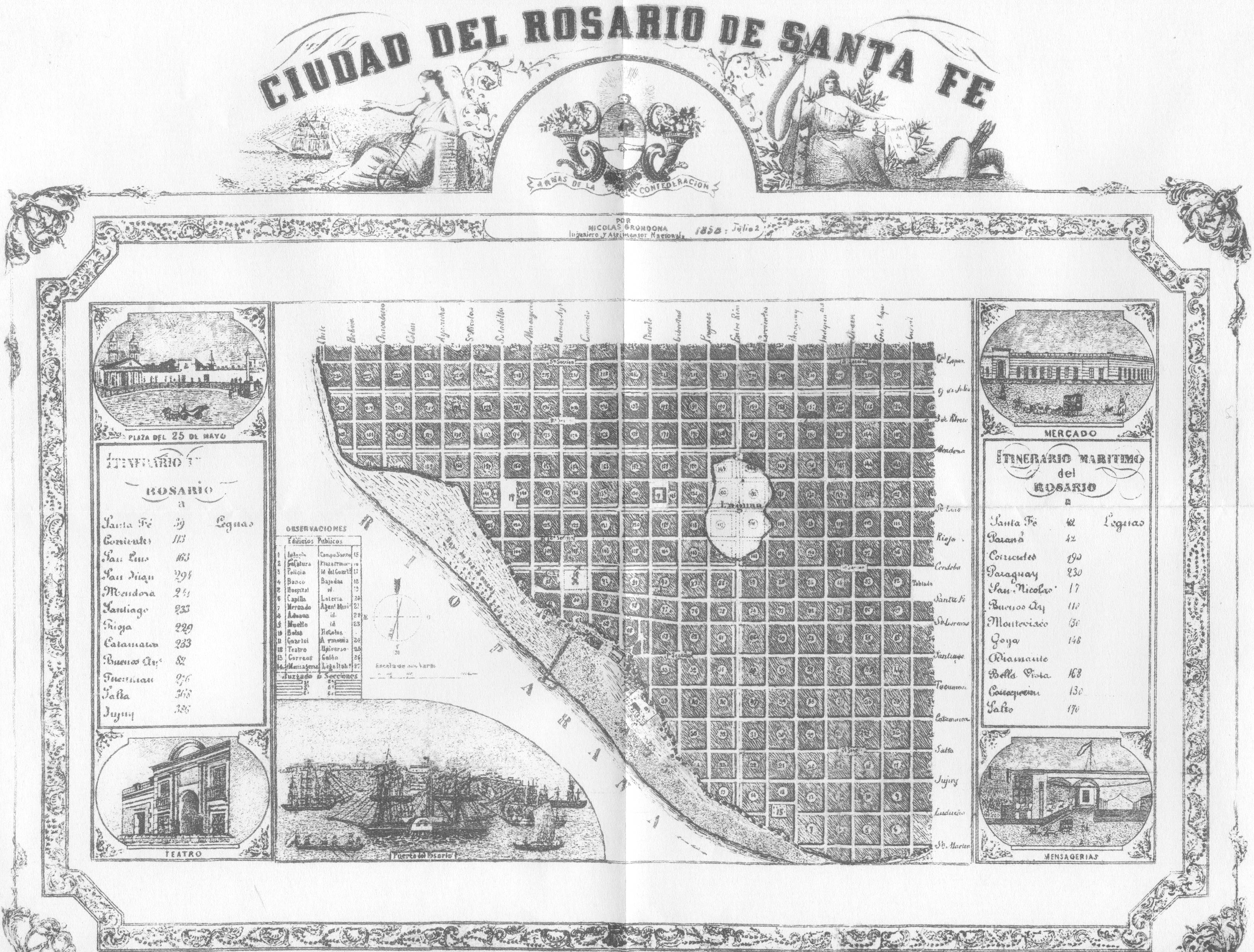
Map of Rosario in 1858.

Rosario lies by the Paraná River, about 300 km upstream from the Argentine capital Buenos Aires; it is a major port and an industrial, commercial and cultural center. It grew from its humble origins to be the third most populated city in Argentina and the largest in the province of Santa Fe. Manuel Belgrano created the flag of Argentina in Rosario.

== Origins ==
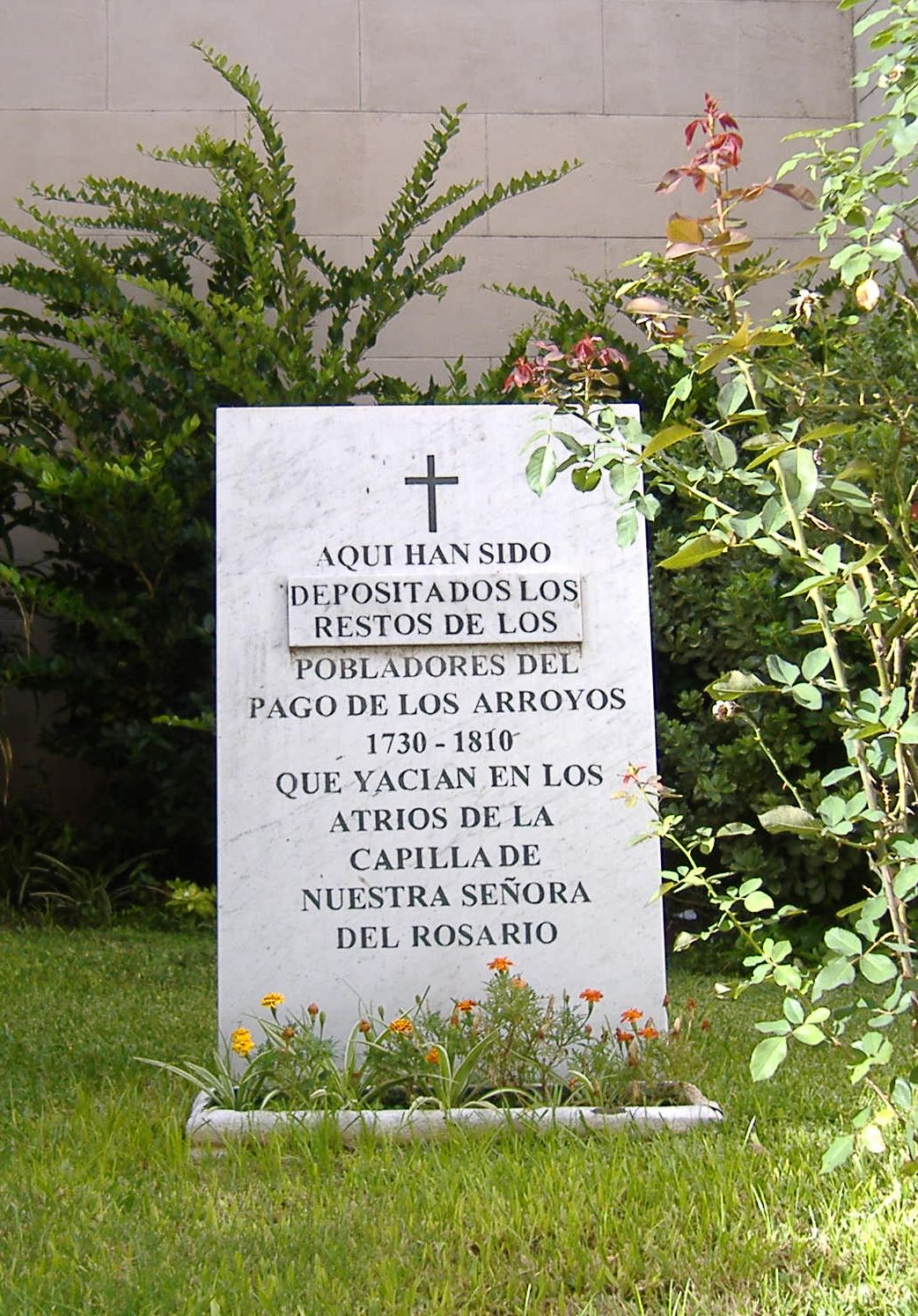
A plaque showing the resting place of the ancient settlers, beside the Cathedral.

Rosario was born at the beginning of the 17th century. At the time it was known as Pago de los Arroyos, that is, "land of the streams", a reference to the several small rivers that traverse the southern region of Santa Fe, like the Ludueña Stream, the Saladillo Stream and others, emptying into the Paraná River. The city did not have a clear foundation date or any official acknowledgement thereof. In 1689, captain Luis Romero de Pineda received part of the lands of the Pago de los Arroyos by royal decree, as payment for services to the Spanish Crown. Before that, the area was originally inhabited by Calchaquí tribes in reducciones, a kind of missions founded by Franciscans. These missions were ultimately attacked and destroyed by hostile tribes of the Chaco.

Romero de Pineda established the first permanent settlement, an estancia, intended as farmland, not as a town. In 1719 the Jesuits bought another part and established Estancia San Miguel. The area was still so scarcely populated that it had no central authority; it was ruled from the provincial capital (Santa Fe), and in turn from Buenos Aires.

In 1724 another colonial settlement was initiated by Santiago de Montenegro, who set up a mill, drew plans for the future town, built a chapel, and was appointed mayor in 1751. The area of control of this local government extended northward from today's Rosario; only in 1784 was it divided into two smaller jurisdictions.

On February 27, 1812, General Manuel Belgrano raised the newly created Argentine flag on the shores of the Paraná, for the first time. Because of this, Rosario is known as the "Cradle of the Argentine Flag". The National Flag Memorial marks the occasion.

== Rosario becomes a city ==
The province of Santa Fe greatly suffered the civil war that afflicted Argentina after 1820. Demographic growth was relatively slow. During this period, Rosario was a small settlement and a stop in the way from Santa Fe City to Buenos Aires. In 1823 it was elevated to the category of "village" (Ilustre y Fiel Villa del Rosario). Charles Darwin travelled through the area in 1832 and described Rosario as "a large town" with about 2,000 residents. In 1841 its port was shut off to foreign trade by a decree of the caudillo and Governor of Buenos Aires, Juan Manuel de Rosas which banned navigation of the Paraná and the Paraguay rivers to non-Argentine vessels.

On 25 December 1851, a small group of locals and the military guard of the city declared their support for the rival caudillo Justo José de Urquiza. As a reward for their participation in the Battle of Caseros, triumphant Urquiza wrote to the governor of Santa Fe on 9 June 1852 asking for Rosario to be granted city status. Governor Domingo Crespo justified the request at the provincial legislative body, marking the geographically strategic position of the town for national and international trade, and on 5 August Rosario was formally declared a city.

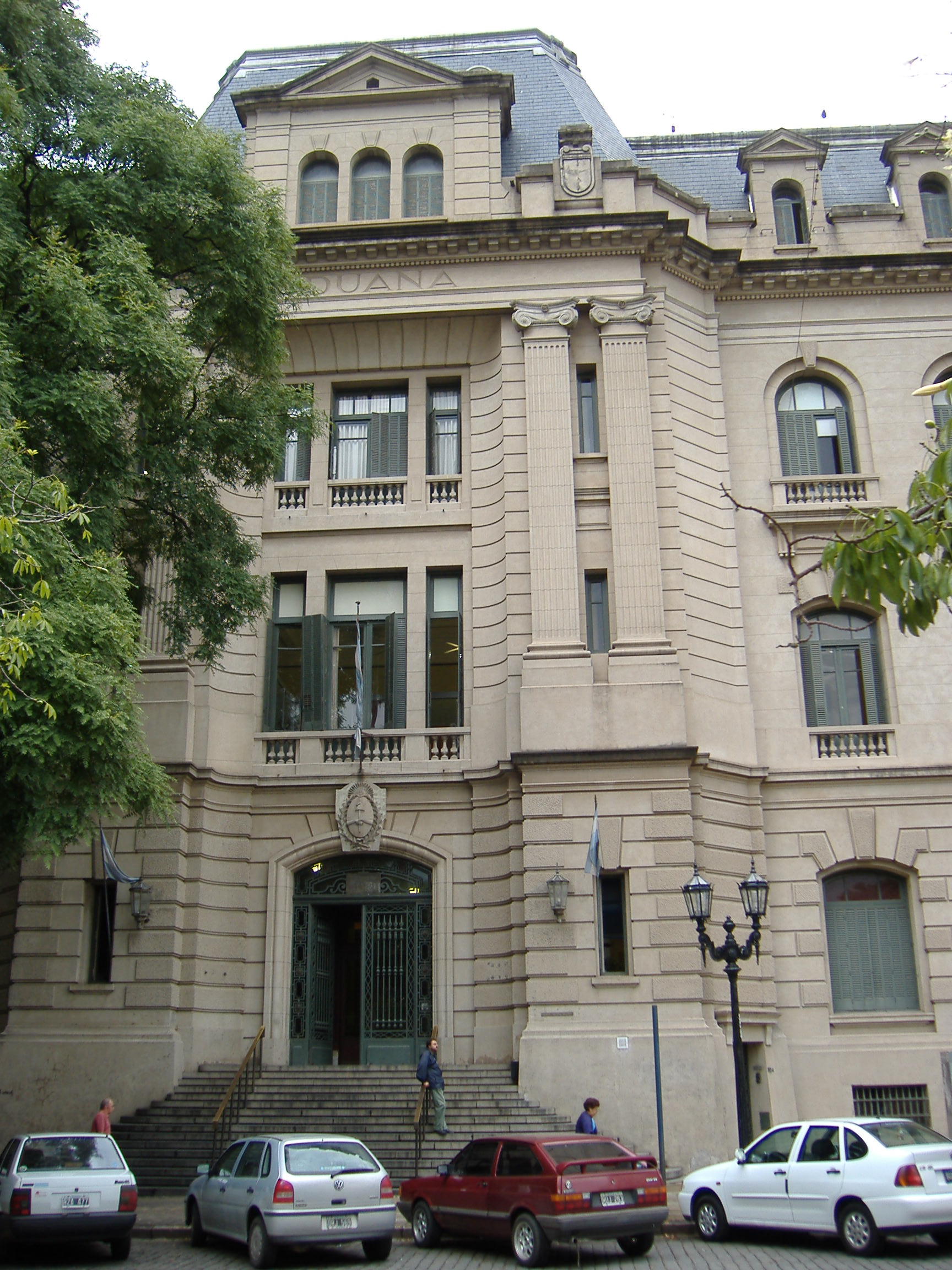
Rosario's old Customs Office, on Belgrano Avenue.

Urquiza opened up the river for free international trade. The city's economy and population expanded at an accelerated rate. By 1880, Rosario had become the first export outlet of Argentina. By 1887 it had about 50,000 inhabitants, of which 40% were immigrants, who brought new ideas from Europe and started turning Rosario into a politically progressive city (contrasting with the more conservative, aristocratic Santa Fe).

During part of the second half of the 19th century there was a movement promoting that the city of Rosario become the capital of the republic. Ovidio Lagos, founder of the oldest Argentine newspaper, La Capital, was one of the strongest defenders of this idea (one of the main avenues in Rosario now carries his name). Rosario was indeed declared the federal capital in three occasions, but each time the law received a veto of the Executive Branch (once by Bartolomé Mitre and twice by Domingo Faustino Sarmiento).

In the last 15 years of the 19th century, the city more than doubled in population. Demographic growth took its toll of bad living conditions, epidemics of contagious diseases such as tuberculosis, and increased labour offer resulting in exploitation. In 1901, a worker on strike was killed by the police for the first time in Rosario. The city then became a major outpost for anarchist movements. The Radical Civic Union produced an uprising in 1903, and the party won in the first elections under the new secret compulsory voting law.

== 20th century ==
The population doubled again in about ten years, and yet again in less than two decades; by 1926 Rosario had 407,000 inhabitants, 47% of them foreign, many brought from Europe in the wake of World War I. Most of them were Italian, and among them, a majority from the north-western region of Liguria.

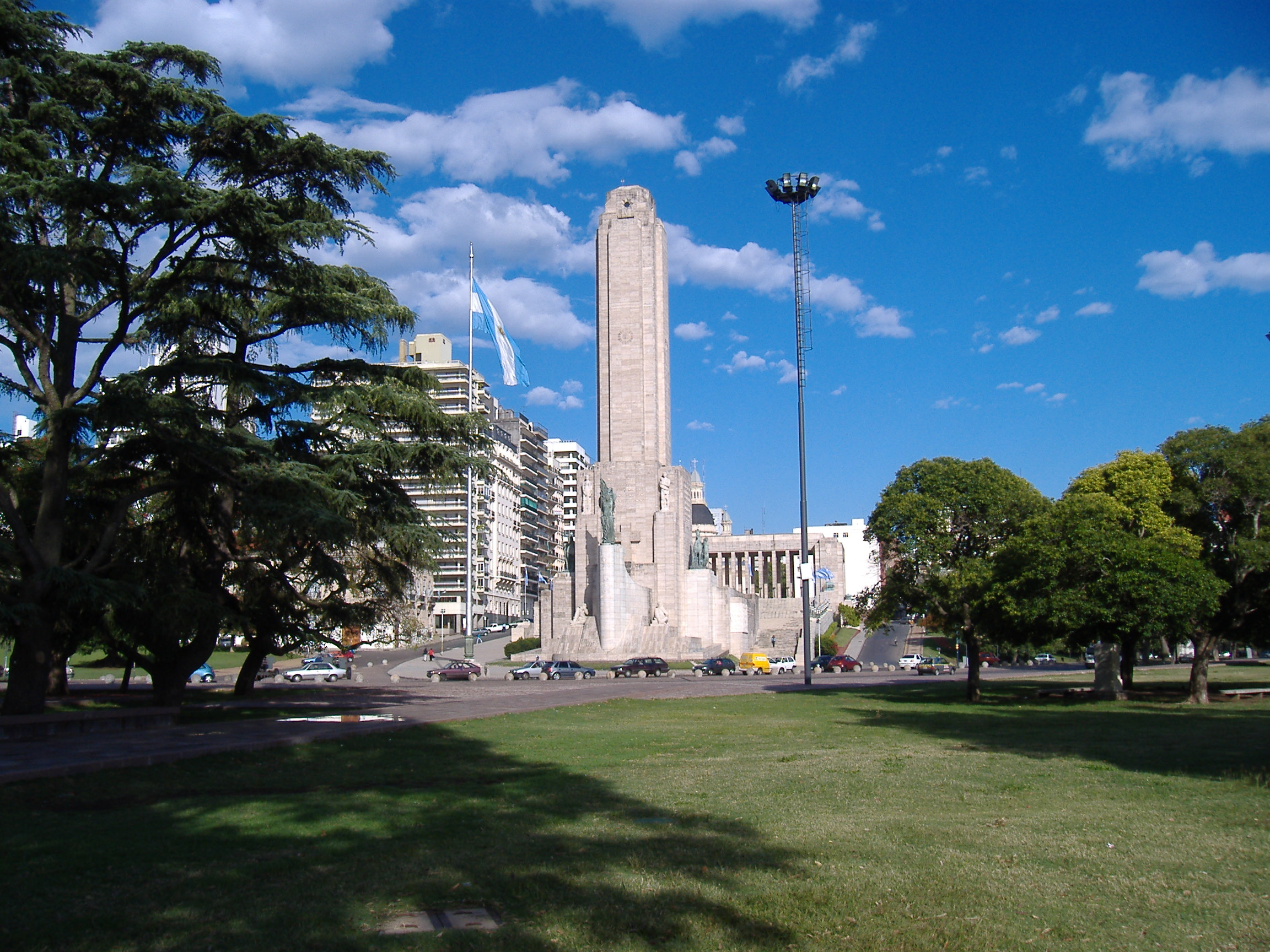
The National Flag Memorial, inaugurated in 1957.

In 1943 the local scholar Juan Álvarez wrote a seminal History of Rosario, which reaffirmed the thesis of Rosario as a "self-made-city", born after the modern capitalist fashion and developed by its own people's work, in contrast with other cities (like Santa Fe) with a traditional, colonial, aristocratic past. (The largest public library in the city now bears the name of Biblioteca Argentina Dr. Juan Álvarez in homage.)

In 1946 Rosario massively supported Juan Perón's rise to power on a populistic platform; 58% of rosarinos voted for him in the presidential elections. Thus Rosario got the nickname of "Capital of Peronism". It received the benefits of the nationalization and subsidizing of many industries, and the more favourable labour laws passed by the government.

After the fall of Perón in 1955, Rosario experienced the hardships of dictatorial rule. In May and September 1969 workers and students massively took the streets to protest against the dictatorship of President Juan Carlos Onganía. This was later known as the Rosariazo, and was triggered in part by the murder of a student by the police, and the repression of labour unions, combined with a general unrest throughout the country. During the September episode, the police were overwhelmed by at least 100,000 protesters, who took the resistance to the peripheric barrios. The Army was given the order to intervene, and violently suffocated the opposition until regaining control of the city.

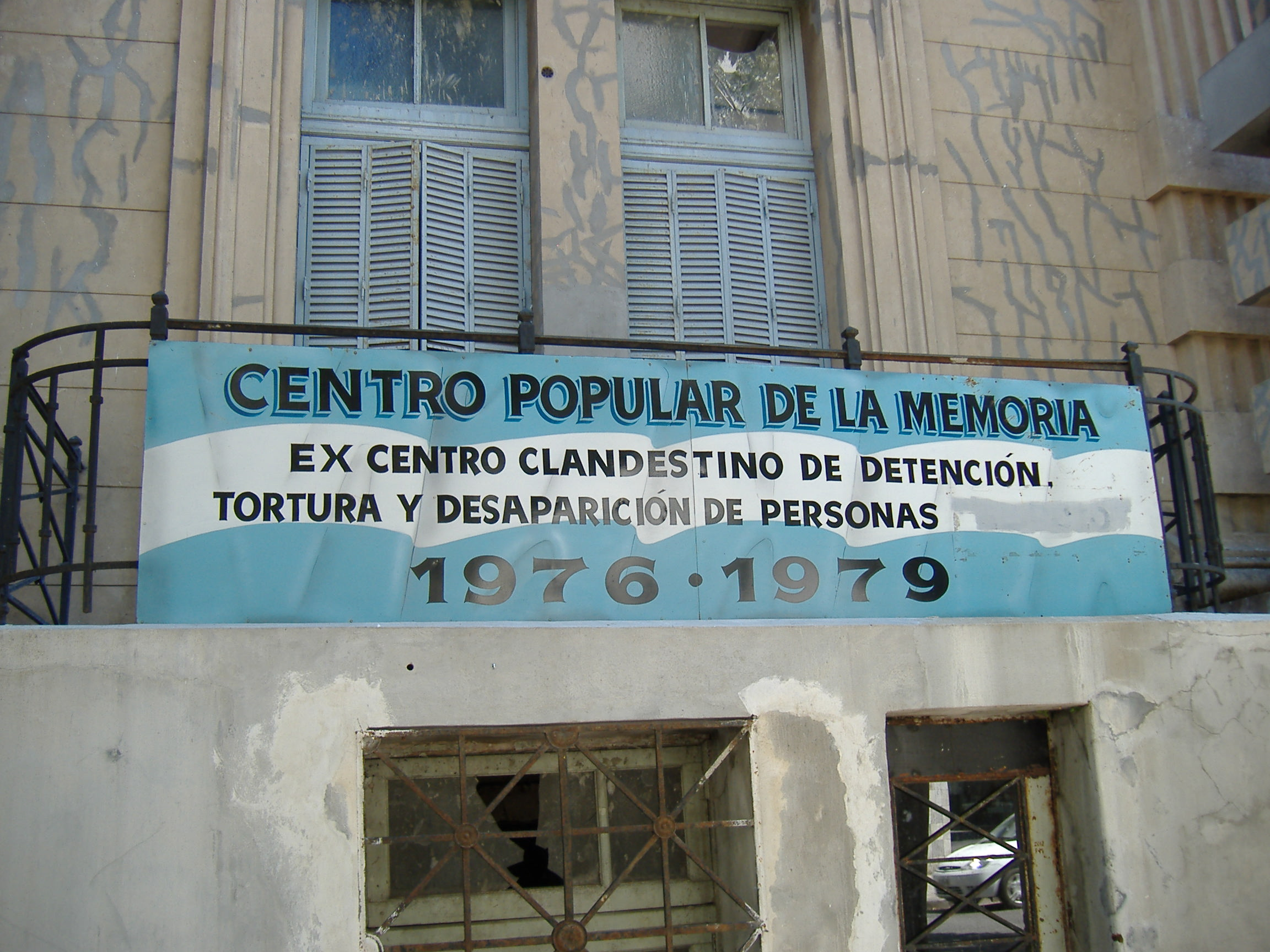
An illegal detention center in Rosario, now a memorial.

During the National Reorganization Process (started in 1976), hundreds of citizens were killed or "disappeared" by the de facto government. Rosario hosted some matches of the Football World Cup 1978, which was used by the military junta as a distraction for the populace, to cover up illegal repression and human rights abuses.

In 1983 Argentina returned to democratic rule. About 400,000 rosarinos attended the final campaign meeting of the Radical Civic Union, which won locally (with the election of Mayor Horacio Usandizaga) and nationally (with President Raúl Alfonsín).

The Ludueña Stream caused great floods in the north of the city in 1986. After several years, popular pressure achieved the goal of damming and piping the stream to avoid future problems of the kind.

== Economic crisis ==
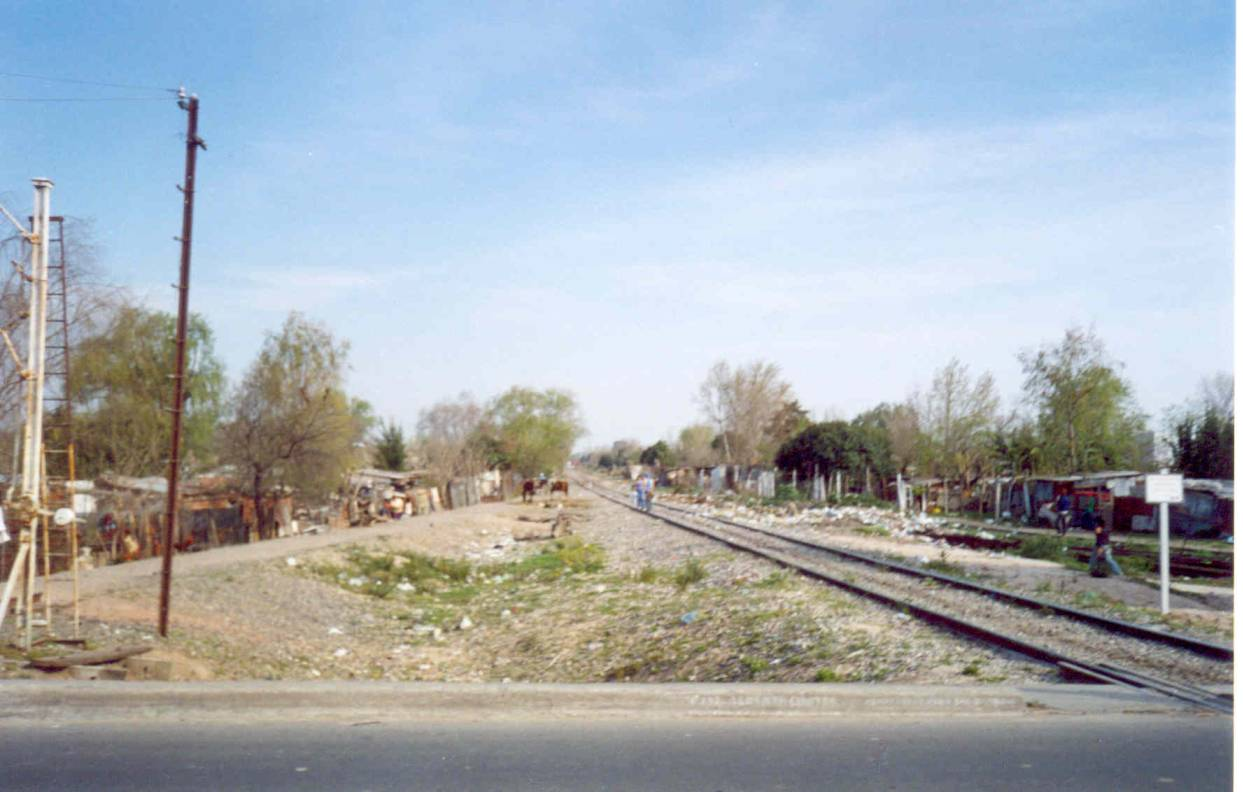
A villa miseria beside a railway track, in north-eastern Rosario.

Hyperinflation (over 3,000%) caused an economic collapse of the country in 1989. In Rosario, protests against the price rises and lack of supplies, coupled with general social discontent and the influence of extremist elements, ended up in riots and looting to supermarkets and other businesses, which then spread to other large cities. Between 26 May and 29 May police repression officially caused 14 casualties in Rosario. President Alfonsín declared a state of emergency (estado de sitio), suspending constitutional guarantees, and on 12 June he resigned, leaving office in the hands of president elect Carlos Menem six months in advance.

The 1990s were the years of the Menem administration. While macroeconomy was healthy and prices stabilized, after a few years of improvement the situation in Rosario turned to the worse, as the industrial sector of the city was dismantled by competition from cheap imports (favoured by the low fixed exchange rate) and the agricultural exports stagnated. In 1995 (the year of Menem's reelection) unemployment in the Rosario area reached 21.1%, the highest in Argentina at the time.

Following the decline of much of the city's once extensive industry, as well as the lack of international competitiveness of agricultural products that make the bulk of production in the region, much of Rosario's population fell under the poverty line. Since then, a sizable proportion of the population lives in villas miseria (shanty towns) lacking toilets, running water and other essential services. These shantytowns have always existed in modern times, but they increased in area and population during this period, often augmented by internal migration (residents of poorer regions of the country, particularly Chaco Province). The last official survey, a study conducted by the Municipal Bank Foundation, dates from 1996; it indicated the presence of 91 precarious settlements, with 115,000 inhabitants (10% of the population of the metropolitan area).

In December 2001, at the peak of the economic recession, poor and unemployed people in Rosario (as in other major cities) again took to looting. Police repression in the December 2001 riots caused 8 casualties in the city, notably that of social activist Pocho Lepratti.

== Recovery and current situation ==
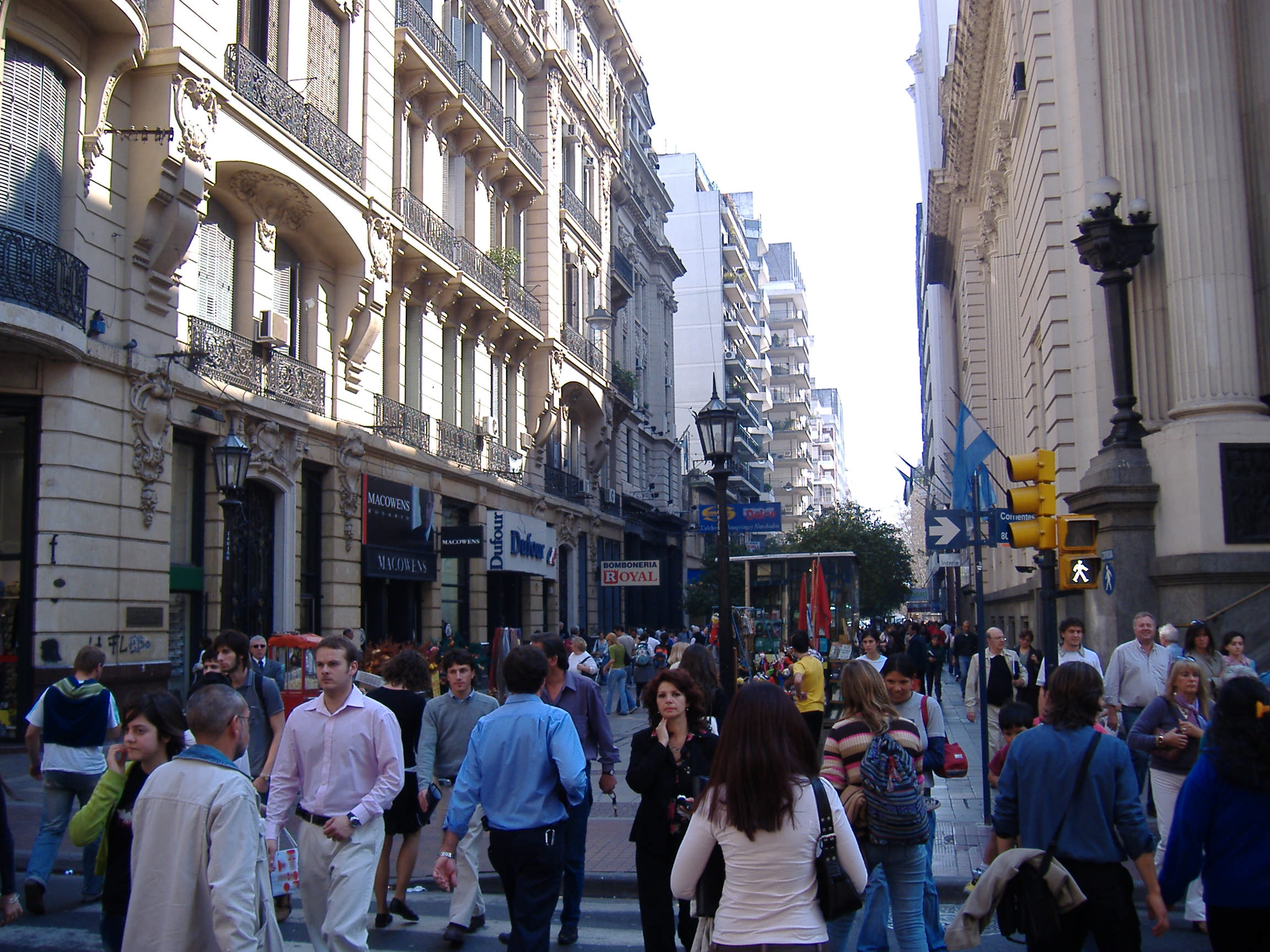
Peatonal Córdoba and Corrientes Ave., at Rosario central district.

Since the recovery of the national economy that followed the 2001 collapse, Rosario's economic situation has improved. It is the fastest growing city in Argentina, a situation which is improving living conditions. The massive boom in agricultural exports (mainly soybean products) in the province has caused a large amount of consumer spending and investment in Rosario, which is also receiving more small-scale tourism than ever. Among the businesses which have opened (or re-opened) in the city, there are two large shopping malls, Alto Rosario and El Portal.

According to the 2001 census [INDEC], the city of Rosario has about 910,000 inhabitants, and the Greater Rosario metropolitan area adds up to more than 1.1 million. A wave of suburban development has been triggered by a recent spike in the price of real estate (from 2005 on), with new neighbourhoods sprouting from formerly underdeveloped areas (such as the north-west, near the airport).

The Mayor (intendente) of Rosario as of 2024 is Pablo Javkin (of the Socialist Party) who was re-elected. This administration is facing a deficit crisis as well as a security one. Rosario is now known in Argentina as "The Drug Capital of Argentina" and NarcoCity.

== See also ==
- History of Argentina

== Sources ==
- Municipalidad de Rosario - Historia (in Spanish) - History of Rosario at the Municipality's official website.
- Griselda B. Tarragó, De la autonomía a la integración - Santa Fe entre 1820 y 1853. Nueva Historia de Santa Fe, vol. 5 (2006).
- Rosario Antiguo (Digital Map with located old photos).
