= Pocho Lepratti =

Argentine political activist (1966 – 2001)

Claudio Hugo Lepratti (27 February 1966 – 19 December 2001), popularly known as Pocho Lepratti, was an Argentine political activist volunteer who worked in a poor neighbourhood in the city of Rosario (province of Santa Fe, Argentina), and who was shot and killed by the Santa Fe Provincial Police during the December 2001 riots, when he tried to stop police agents from firing at a children's school.

He has recently been proposed as a candidate for sainthood.

== Biography ==
=== Early years and work ===
Lepratti was born in Concepción del Uruguay, Entre Ríos, and studied Law between 1983 and 1985, while at the same time serving as a cooperator of the Salesians of Don Bosco. After that, he entered the Ceferino Namuncurá Salesian Seminary in Funes, Santa Fe (a town in the Greater Rosario area), as a coadjutor brother. He studied Philosophy and became a professor.

The students of the seminary were customarily taken to visit nearby places to get in contact with the everyday reality of the poor and work with them. Lepratti eventually asked to extend this practice to constant work among the poor, but his superiors told him that he needed to take vows of obedience and keep studying. Due to this, after five years he left the seminary and went to live in a villa miseria or shanty town in Barrio Ludueña, Rosario. In the parish led by Father Edgardo Montaldo, he created and coordinated a number of child and youth groups, organizing camping excursions, workshops, etc. He worked as a kitchen assistant in the associated facilities that provided food for the poor children in the villa, and taught philosophy and theology in the parochial school.

=== The murder ===
At the end of 2001, Argentina was nearing the peak of an economic crisis marked by long-term recession and massive unemployment. On 18 December, riots and looting of supermarkets and stores, initiated by activists who requested food, broke out in Rosario and Greater Buenos Aires. President Fernando de la Rúa dictated a state of emergency, suspending constitutional guarantees, and violent repression ensued.Lepratti lived in the villa miseria in Ludueña but was doing daily volunteer work in a school located in Barrio Las Flores, a poor neighbourhood in southern Rosario. On 19 December, the Santa Fe Provincial Police raided the area of the school to suffocate an evolving protest, with people picketing and blocking a nearby major avenue. Lepratti and two other members of the school staff climbed to the roof of the school to assess the situation, and amid the shooting, they demanded that the police cease fire: "Lay down your weapons, inside there is only children eating."

According to witnesses and the investigation conducted later by the Internal Affairs Department of the police, a patrol car belonging to the Radioelectrical Command of Arroyo Seco stopped by the school, and two police agents got off and fired at the roof. One of them, Ernesto Esteban Velázquez, killed Lepratti. A shotgun blast had torn through his trachea. Lepratti was quickly taken to the Roque Sáenz Peña Hospital but died before arriving there.

The repression of protests took four casualties in Rosario that day. On 20 December, amid violent demonstrations, looting and riots in the major Argentine cities, President De la Rúa resigned.

== Murder investigation ==
A Non-Governmental Investigative Commission was assembled in July 2002 to bring light on the alleged murders committed by the police in Santa Fe. It was determined that a substantial coverup had taken place.

On Lepratti's case, a witness claimed that she had filed a denunciation of shooting in a police station, but the personnel had refused to take it in writing. The records of the police station stated that Lepratti had died in an exchange of fire. The time, the jurisdiction of the station, and the witness retelling of the situation later in court did not match. Furthermore, the police car showed two bullet impacts which could not have been made from the roof of the school, but appeared to have been done later to match the police version. Finally, the police made up a charge of resistance to authority on the part of Lepratti.

Based on the coincidence between the bullet types, and following the testimony of the two witnesses, officer E. E. Velázquez was indicted by judge Osvaldo Barbero. Velézquez first claimed that the shots that killed Lepratti were done before he and his companion, sergeant Rubén Darío Pérez, left their vehicle. Then he changed his statement, claiming he had only shot upwards into the air. The forged police records claimed that the patrol car had been shot at by unknown attackers, who had escaped after dissuasive fire. Nine officers were indicted for the alteration of the records, but they refused to speak.

One of these, sergeant Jorge Alberto Orué, eventually caved in. Before a judge, he declared that Velázquez was already aware that Lepratti was dead when he returned there after the shooting, but that he insisted he had used rubber bullets. Later that day, Orué said, several high-rank officers (including the head of the Arroyo Seco Radioelectrical Command, Velázquez's superior, and others not belonging to the station's staff) came and gathered behind closed doors at the police station. It was then, presumably, that the fake records were written and the cover story was devised.

Ernesto Esteban Velázquez was tried for murder, and the prosecutor asked for an 18-year prison term. Velázquez was found guilty of murder and sentenced to 14 years on 5 August 2004 by judge Ernesto Genesio. The sentence was immediately appealed, but it was ratified on 30 September 2005. The provincial state was additionally sentenced to pay AR$145,000 (around US$50,000) in reparations to Lepratti's family. Velázquez's senior officers, the presumed authors of the orders to suffocate the protest, were not tried. With regards to officer Pérez, who was beside Velázquez at the time of the murder, the evidence was deemed not enough to merit prosecution.

== Legacy of Lepratti ==
Claudio Pocho Lepratti soon became a symbol of social activism and of the fight against injustice and repressive authorities.

In 2003 Lepratti's former house was turned into a culture house (Bodegón Cultural Casa de Pocho), which includes a Popular Library. The library published a book, Pocho vive ("Pocho Lives"), with collaborations including Father Montaldo's stories about the daily work of Lepratti, details of the investigation of his murder, and an analysis of groups of marginalized people brought together by solidarity.

A square located in Barrio Ludueña, near Lepratti's house, was renamed Plaza Pocho Lepratti, and the Carnival season, along with Lepratti's birthday, is celebrated there every year by a murga and by rock bands, formed in part by local young people that he coached and taught. The commemoration of Lepratti's birth in 2006 gathered more than 6,000 people.

In 2003, the municipality of Rosario opened a public primary healthcare center in Barrio Las Flores, with the name of Pocho Lepratti, besides the school where he was killed.

In 2004, Rosario audiovisual producer Francisco Matiozzi made a documentary film, Pochormiga about Lepratti, which was awarded the Best Documentary Film Award at the Rosario Latin-American Video Film Festival, among other awards and special mentions. The title, a conflation of Pocho and the Spanish word hormiga ("ant"), alludes to Lepratti's minuscule but busy and perseverant work. It was shown in the Congreso de laS LenguaS (a counter-cultural meeting held in parallel with the Third International Congress of the Spanish Language), and in public theaters and culture centers in Rosario and Buenos Aires. It received the Best Short Subject Film on Human Rights Award at the Third FEISAL Festival in Buenos Aires in June 2005, an accomplishment that earned it more international coverage. In November 2005, it was presented at the Deliberative Council of Rosario, and 250 copies were given to public schools of the city.

Popular folk-rock composer León Gieco, well known for his involvement in social causes, wrote a song dedicated to Lepratti, El ángel de la bicicleta ("The Angel of the Bicycle", alluding to Lepratti's main means of transportation). The song was released as a single from Gieco's 2005 album Por Favor, Perdón y Gracias. The music video for the single shows scenes of the December 2001 riots and the police repression, along with people writing allegorical graffitis about Lepratti. Such graffiti commonly appear with the phrase Pocho vive ("Pocho Lives") and the picture of an ant or a winged silhouette (an angel) riding a bicycle, and they have sprung up in Rosario's walls, including the downtown area. This graffiti should not be confused with Fernando Traverso's Bicis, an unrelated memorial art expression.

On the fourth anniversary of the riots, a demonstration in Rosario demanded punishment for the nine deaths occurred in the days between 18 December and 21 December 2001 in Santa Fe, of which only the direct responsible of Lepratti's has been tried. A statement, read in part by Lepratti's sister Celeste, claimed that there was a defined operational scheme coordinated by the national government to repress protests with lethal force. They laid down the blame for Santa Fe's murders on then-governor Carlos Reutemann, and criticized the workings of the Judicial Branch, which let many policemen and officials free and slowed down or paralyzed the investigations.

In 2006 the Deliberative Council of Concepción del Uruguay, Lepratti's birthplace, approved a project to build a commemorative monument. A contest of ideas was opened in September, to decide on its design. The municipality of Concepción del Uruguay had already named a street in Lepratti's homage.
