= International Conference of the Spanish Language =

Spanish-language conference

International Conference of the Spanish Language Spanish: Congreso Internacional de la Lengua Española
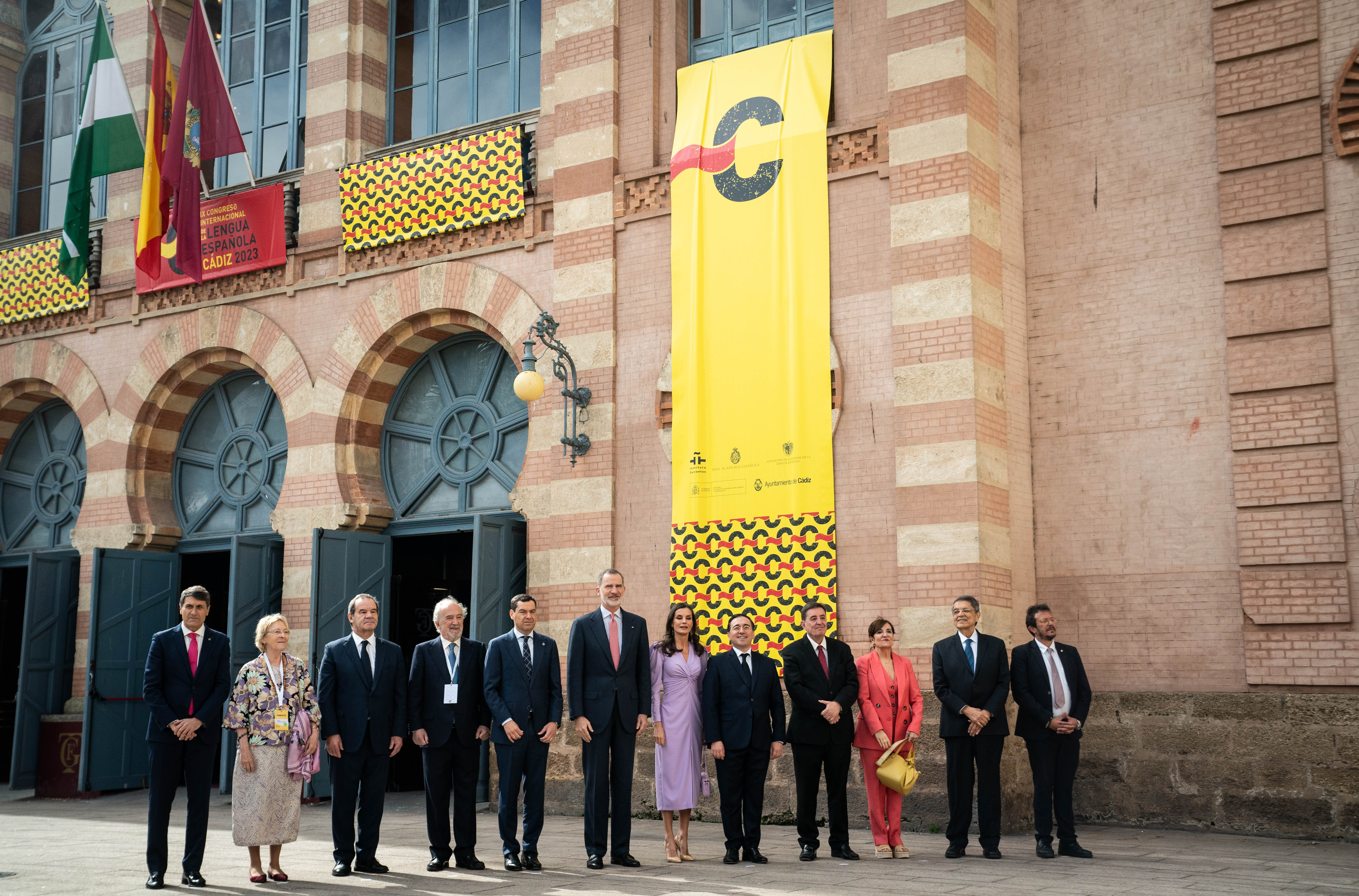
- Official photo, in front of the Gran Teatro Falla Theater in Cádiz, at the inauguration of the Ninth Conference of the Spanish Language. Those present include the King and Queen of Spain, the President of the Junta, the Minister of Foreign Affairs and the Mayor of Cádiz.
- Frequency: Triennial
- Inaugurated: 7–11 April 1997
- Most recent: 27–30 March 2023
- Next event: 2025
- Organiser: Instituto Cervantes; Royal Spanish Academy; Association of Academies of the Spanish Language
- Website: https://congresosdelalengua.es/

The International Conference of the Spanish Language (Spanish: Congreso Internacional de la Lengua Española, CILE), is a forum for reflection on issues related to the Spanish language, such as the problems and challenges faced by its speakers. It is held every three years in a city located in either Spain or Hispanic America. Its organizers are the Instituto Cervantes—which serves as the permanent general secretariat—the Royal Spanish Academy, and the Association of Academies of the Spanish Language, as well as the country in charge of each edition.

The aim of the conference is to raise awareness of the joint responsibility shared by governments, institutions, and individuals in the promotion and unity of the language, understood as the backbone of the Ibero-American community in all areas, in a dialogue with other languages that are part of its living common heritage. Participants include writers, academics, intellectuals, professionals, and experts related to the fields of linguistics, communications, and the Spanish language in general.

== History ==
The International Conference of the Spanish Language was held for the first time in 1997 in Zacatecas, Mexico. Since then, it has been held in various Spanish-speaking countries.

=== Versions ===
Version	Date	City	Country	Slogan
I (1997)	7–11 April 1997	Zacatecas	Mexico	La lengua y los medios de comunicación (Note: English: Language and the media)
II (2001)	16–19 October 2001	Valladolid	Spain	El español en la sociedad de la información (Note: English: Spanish in the information society)
III (2004)	17–20 November 2004	Rosario	Argentina	Identidad lingüística y globalización (Note: English: Linguistic identity and globalization)
IV (2007)	26–29 March 2007	Cartagena de Indias	Colombia	Presente y futuro de la lengua española: unidad en la diversidad (Note: English: Present and future of the Spanish language: unity in diversity)
V (2010)	2–6 March 2010; suspended due to the 2010 Chile earthquake	Valparaíso	Chile	América en lengua española (Note: English: America in the Spanish language)
VI (2013)	20–23 October 2013	Panama City	Panama	El español en el libro: del Atlántico al Mar del Sur (Note: English: The Spanish language in books: from the Atlantic Ocean to the South Sea)
VII (2016)	11–19 March 2016	San Juan	Puerto Rico	Lengua española y creatividad (Note: English: Spanish language and creativity)
VIII (2019)	27–30 March 2019	Córdoba	Argentina	América y el futuro del español. Cultura y educación, tecnología y emprendimiento. (Note: English: The Americas and the future of the Spanish language. Culture and education, technology, and entrepreneurship.)
IX (2023)	27–30 March 2023	Cádiz	Spain	Lengua española, mestizaje e interculturalidad. Historia y futuro. (Note: English: The Spanish language, miscegenation, and interculturality. History and future.)
X (2025)	2025	Arequipa	Peru	

== Controversies ==
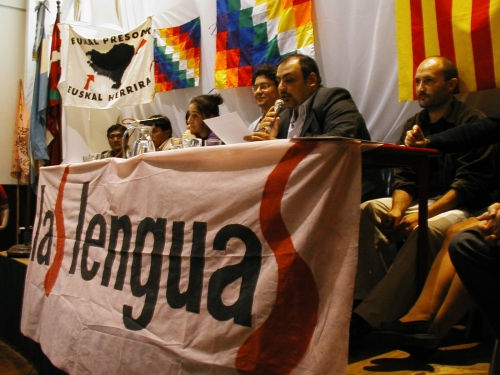
A lecture during the Congreso de laS LenguaS (note the official banner with the two capital letter Ss marking the plurals of las lenguas (Note: English: The languages, as opposed to just la lengua española or "the Spanish language" in the conference's title.)).

Despite its brief history, the conference has not been without its share of bitter disputes. At the first conference in 1997, in Zacatecas, the presentation given by Gabriel García Márquez, titled Botella al mar para el dios de las palabras, advocated for la jubilación de la ortografía. (Note: English: The retirement of spelling)

In 2004, in Rosario, at the same time as the third conference was being held, Argentinian Nobel Peace Prize winner Adolfo Pérez Esquivel inaugurated the 1st Congreso de laS LenguaS to demand that the memory and identity of the languages spoken by the indigenous peoples of the Americas be recovered.

Moreover, the participation of linguist Nélida Donni de Mirande, a native of Rosario, was cancelled due to her being accused by the National University of Rosario of having collaborated with the last military dictatorship in Argentina (1976–1983).

Then, in 2016, in San Juan, there was an "unnecessary discussion" surrounding the inclusion in the dictionary of the term puertorriqueñidad. (Note: English: The character or condition of being Puerto Rican) In addition, Víctor García de la Concha, at the time the director of Instituto Cervantes, mentioned that it was the first time that the conference was being held fuera del ámbito de la comunidad iberoamericana de naciones. (Note: English: Outside the scope of the Ibero-American community of nations) While the King of Spain Felipe VI expressed his joy at "returning to the United States."

== See also ==
- Third International Congress of the Spanish Language
- Congreso de laS LenguaS
- Association of Academies of the Spanish Language
- Hispanism
- Panhispanism
