= Teatro El Círculo =

Theater in Argentina

Coordinates: 32°57′8″S 60°38′6″W

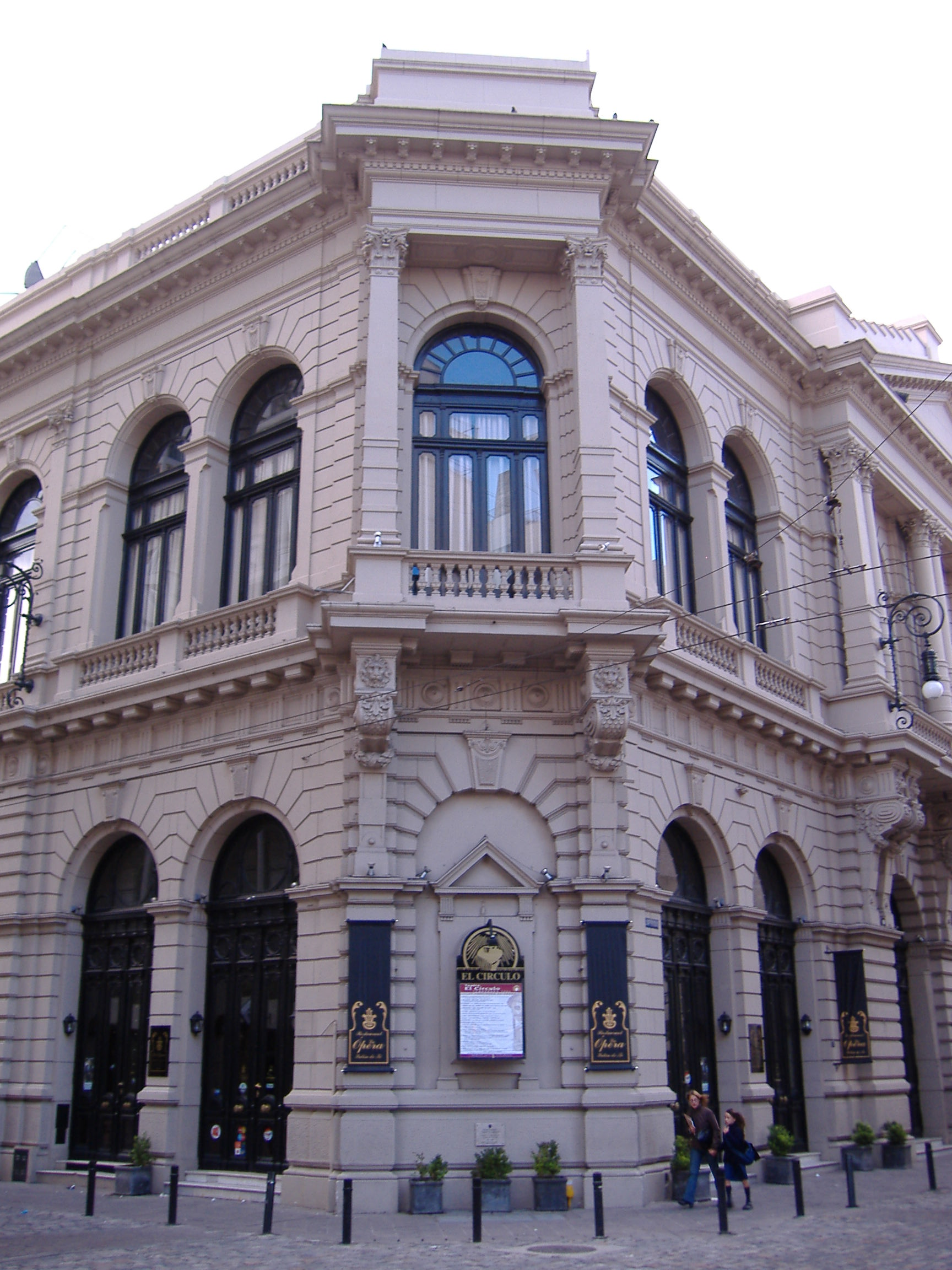
The theater, from the corner of Laprida & Mendoza St.

Teatro El Círculo is a theater in Rosario, Argentina.

== Overview ==
It is located near the historical center of the city, at the intersection of Laprida and Mendoza Streets. Planned as a lyric theater, it was developed as Teatro La Ópera by Emilio O. Schiffner, who purchased the society of the same name in 1889. Schiffner contracted German engineer George Goldammer, an acoustician who modified the original design, and the construction firm of Bianchi, Vila y Compañía. Following delays caused by the Panic of 1890, as well as the earlier society's debts, the theatre was started in 1903. Italian artists, directed by Luggi Levoni, decorated both the interiors and exteriors; among their notable creations was the stage curtain designed by Giuseppe Carmignani with images from Greek mythology similar to those found in the Teatro Regio di Parma. Teatro La Ópera was inaugurated on June 4, 1904, with the performance of Giuseppe Verdi's Otello.

The theater received many artists from around the world, including opera singers, ballets, and orchestras. Enrico Caruso performed there in 1915, and compared its acoustic quality to that of the Metropolitan Opera House in New York.

After this phase of splendor, the theater began to decay, and by 1940 its demolition was being actively considered by the city. The abandoned catacombs underneath the theatre were converted into the Museum of Sacred Art in 1940 to house the prolific work of sculptor Eduardo Barnes. A cultural association known El Círculo de la Biblioteca (The Library Circle), who previously gathered at the Biblioteca Argentina and needed another place for their meetings, acquired the building in 1943, preserved it, and changed its name to the present one.

The theater has a capacity of 1,450 people, in five levels. It currently functions mostly as a cultural center. It was fully restored for its 100th anniversary in 2004, and served as a stage for the Third International Congress of the Spanish Language. The sidewalks and the two streets around the corner of the theater were turned into a sort of plaza with an early 20th-century look, using old lampposts and replacing the usual asphalted surface with cobblestones.

== Gallery ==
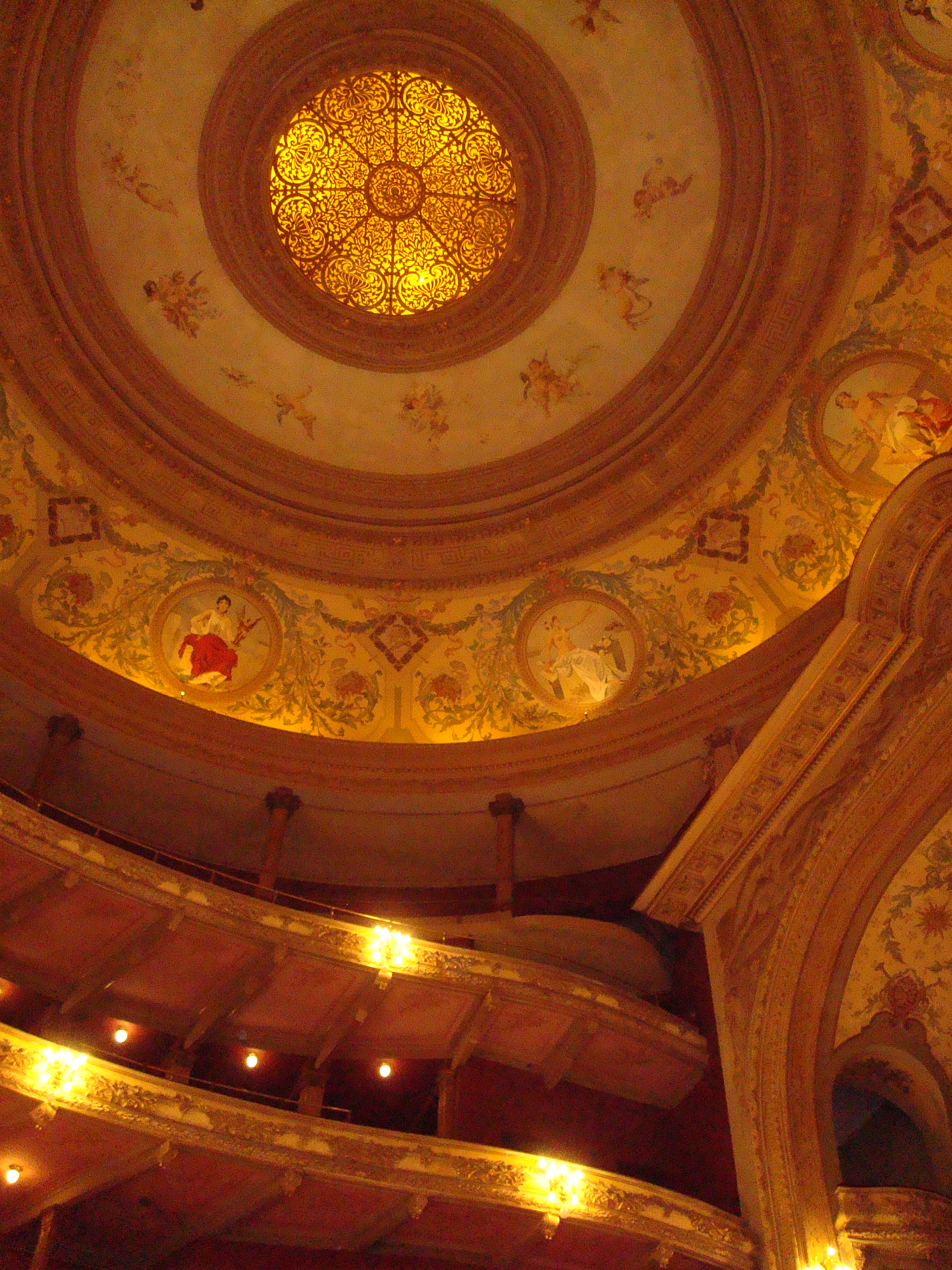
Concert hall ceiling

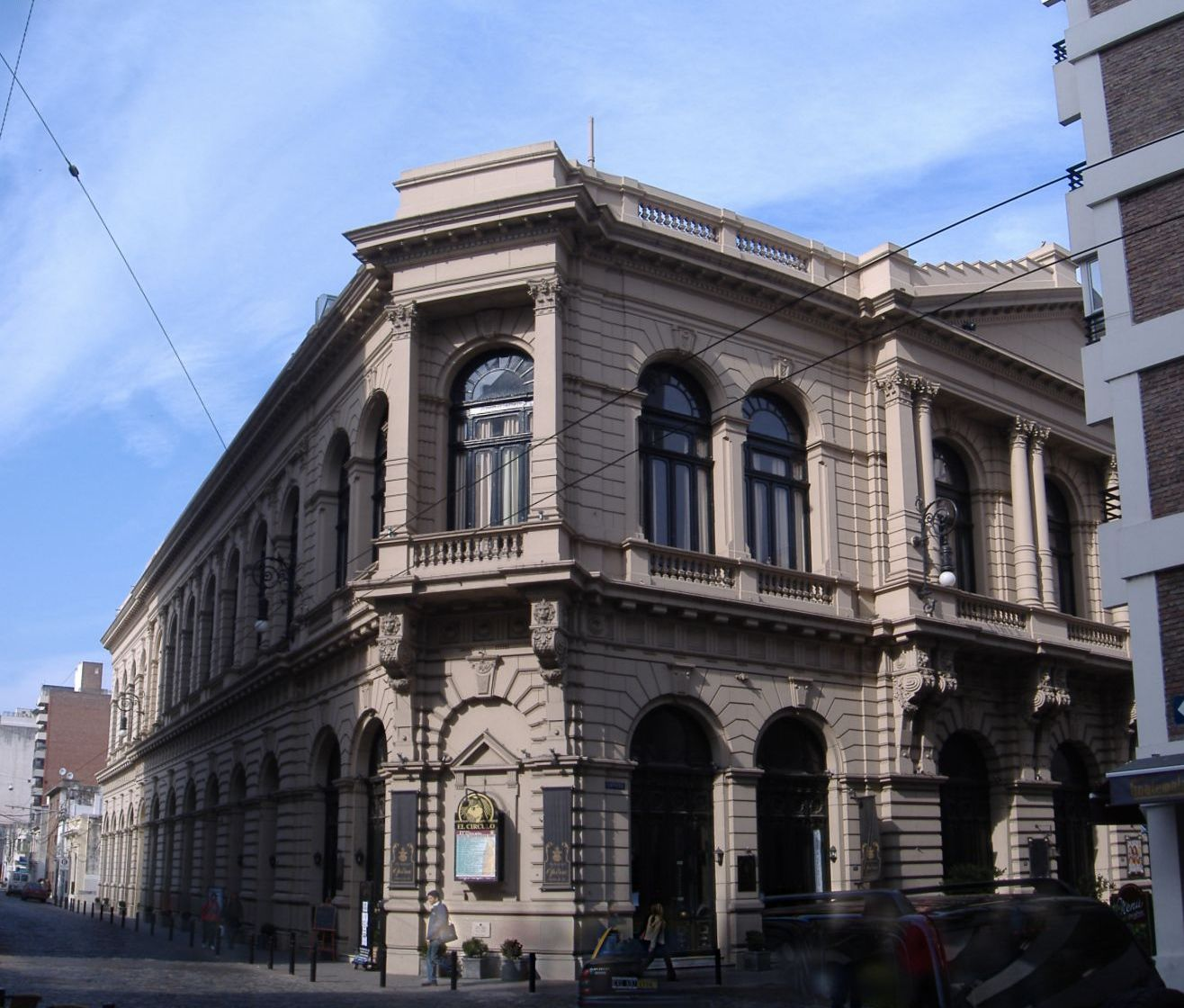
View of the building

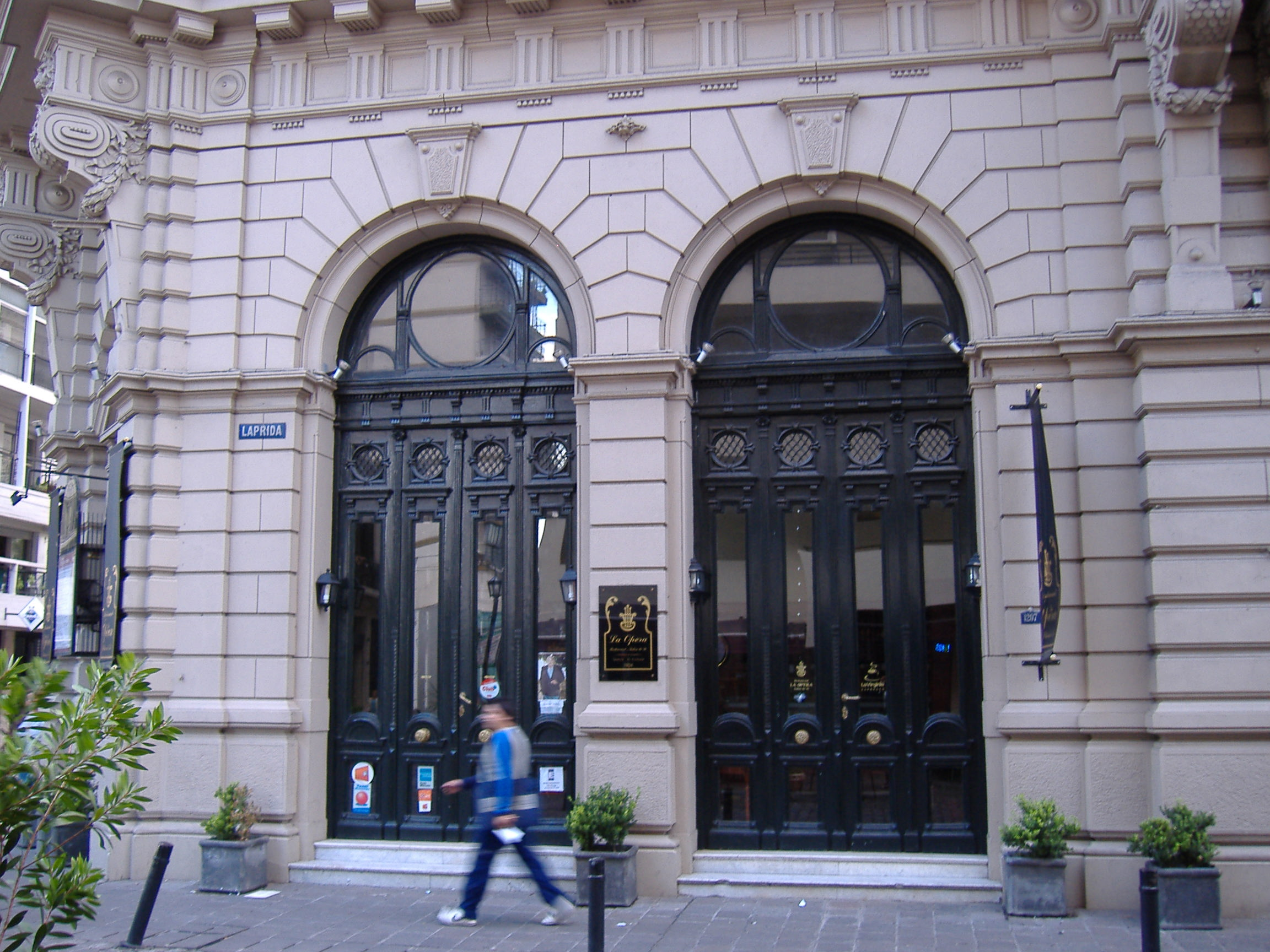
Access to the building, corner of Laprida and Mendoza streets

== See also ==
- List of concert halls
