= Juan Álvarez (historian) =

Argentine historian (1878–1954)

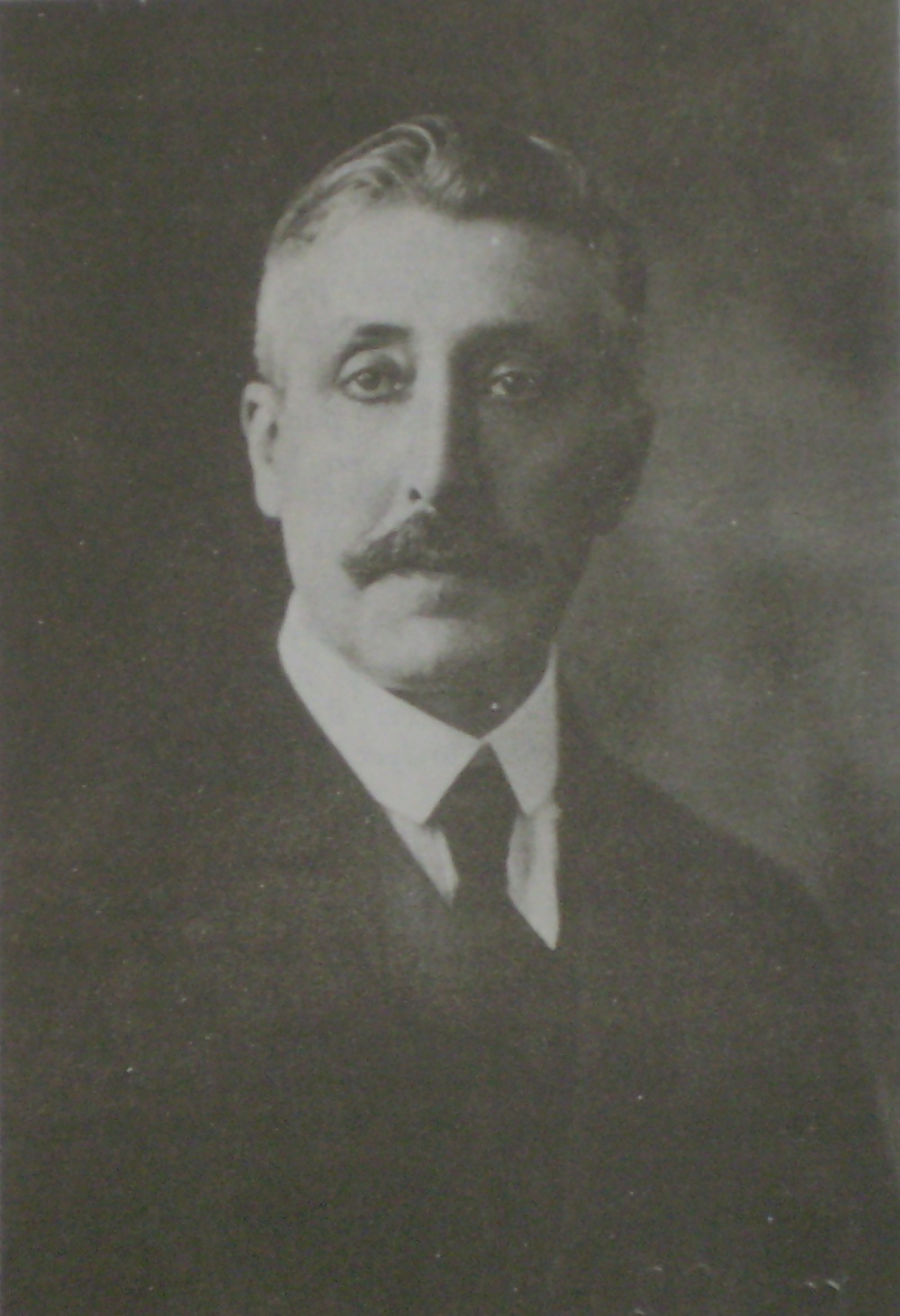

Attorney General of Argentina
- In office 1935–1947
- Preceded by: Horacio Rodríguez Larreta
- Succeeded by: Carlos Gabriel Delfino

Personal details
- Born: 3 September 1878 Gualeguaychú, Entre Ríos, Argentina
- Died: 8 April 1954 (aged 75) Rosario

Juan Álvarez (3 September 1878 – 8 April 1954) was a judge and historian born in Gualeguaychú, province of Entre Ríos, Argentina.

== Biography ==
Álvarez was born at a time of massive immigration in Argentina. His father, Serafín Álvarez, was an exiled Republican Spaniard; within the family, discussions about society, politics and religion were common. He studied at the Faculty of Law in Buenos Aires, where the ruling class of the time was raised. His doctoral thesis was evaluated by Bartolomé Mitre.

Since 1902, he worked at the Tribunals of Rosario, as a secretary, attorney, prosecutor and judge. He lived most of his life in this dynamic and rapidly growing city of the province of Santa Fe, and made friends within the professional and business elite, as well as firm links with other Argentine intellectuals. He was of a liberal mindset, opposed to nationalism and the tendency to worship tradition.

His first books argued that the roots of a nationality should not be sought in the old times, but in the future. This topic was especially relevant due to the wave of nationalistic pride sweeping Argentina near the centennial of its liberation from Spain (the May Revolution of 1810). In his Essay on the history of Santa Fe he went as far as claiming that Argentine history is nonexistent before 1853 (year of the framing of Constitution).

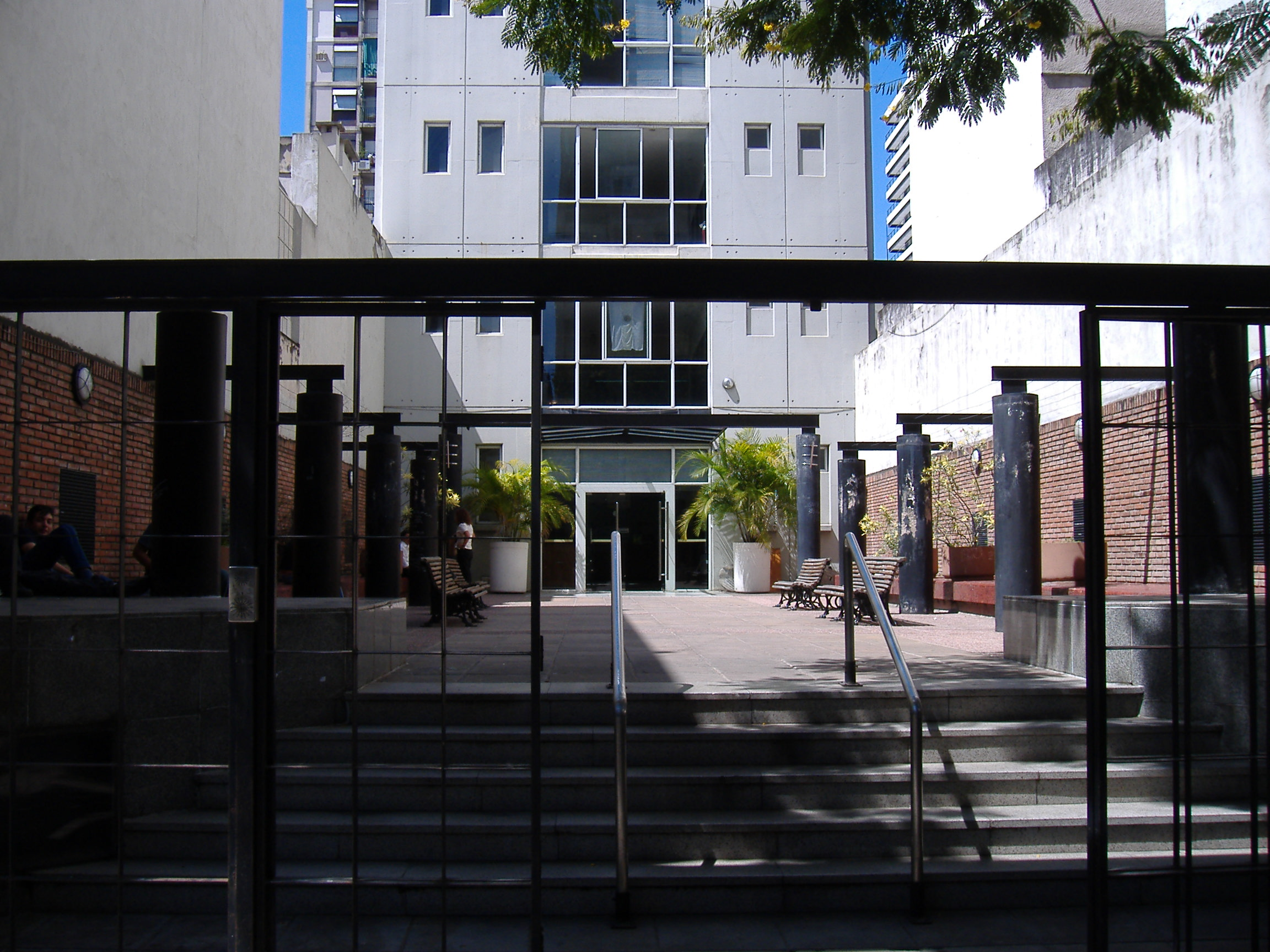
The main entrance of the Biblioteca Argentina on Presidente Roca St., Rosario.

In 1913, Álvarez founded a public library in Rosario. This library, which is the largest in the city, carries at present the name of Biblioteca Argentina Dr. Juan Álvarez.

In 1914, Álvarez wrote about the civil wars of Argentina from an economic point of view, and explicitly looking to prevent similar wars in the future. World War I and the Russian Revolution of 1917 affected his liberal mindset, which led him to write a criticism of liberalism and its limitations. Similar crises came after the Sáenz Peña Law of secret and compulsory suffrage and the conservative revolution of 1930. Álvarez turned towards conservatism, unsure about the new developments in the relationship between citizens, institutions and the state.

In 1943, he wrote Historia de Rosario (1689–1939) ("History of Rosario"), which, like other works that deal with the interaction of geography, economy and politics, is considered a seminal work, which introduces the concept of the city as a subject matter, starting from its local identity, without a forced reference to national matters. His thesis about the asymmetric relationships between his adopted home town, Rosario, and the capital city of Santa Fe, opposes the dynamism of the former (devoid of a colonial past or an aristocratic class) and the bureaucratic tradition of the latter. This idea is still considered valid and continues to re-emerge in popular and intellectual discourse today.

Álvarez was the Attorney General of the Nation between 1935 and 1946. He died in Rosario in 1954.

== Sources ==
- News and comments at the online edition of La Capital newspaper of Rosario, 4 April 2004:
