= Rosariazo =

1969 anti-government protest movement in Rosario, Santa Fe, Argentina

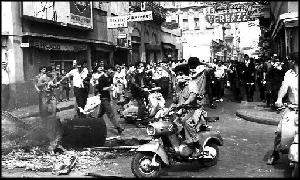
A protest picket

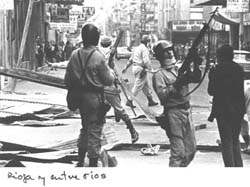
Police in downtown Rosario

The Rosariazo (Spanish pronunciation: [rosaˈɾjaso]) was a protest movement that consisted in demonstrations and strikes, in Rosario, province of Santa Fe, Argentina, between May and September 1969, during the military dictatorial rule of de facto President General Juan Carlos Onganía. The Rosariazo was caused by events in other parts of Argentina, and in turn triggered similar protests itself.

== Prelude ==
There was a general climate of unrest caused by social injustice in the country. On 13 May 1969, in Tucumán, former workers of a sugar mill took the factory and its manager as hostage, asking for overdue payments. On 14 May, in Córdoba, automobile industry workers protested the elimination of the Saturday rest. On 15 May the University of Corrientes increased the price of food tickets in its cafeteria fivefold, and the ensuing protest ended up with one student, Juan José Cabral, killed by the police.

== First Rosariazo ==
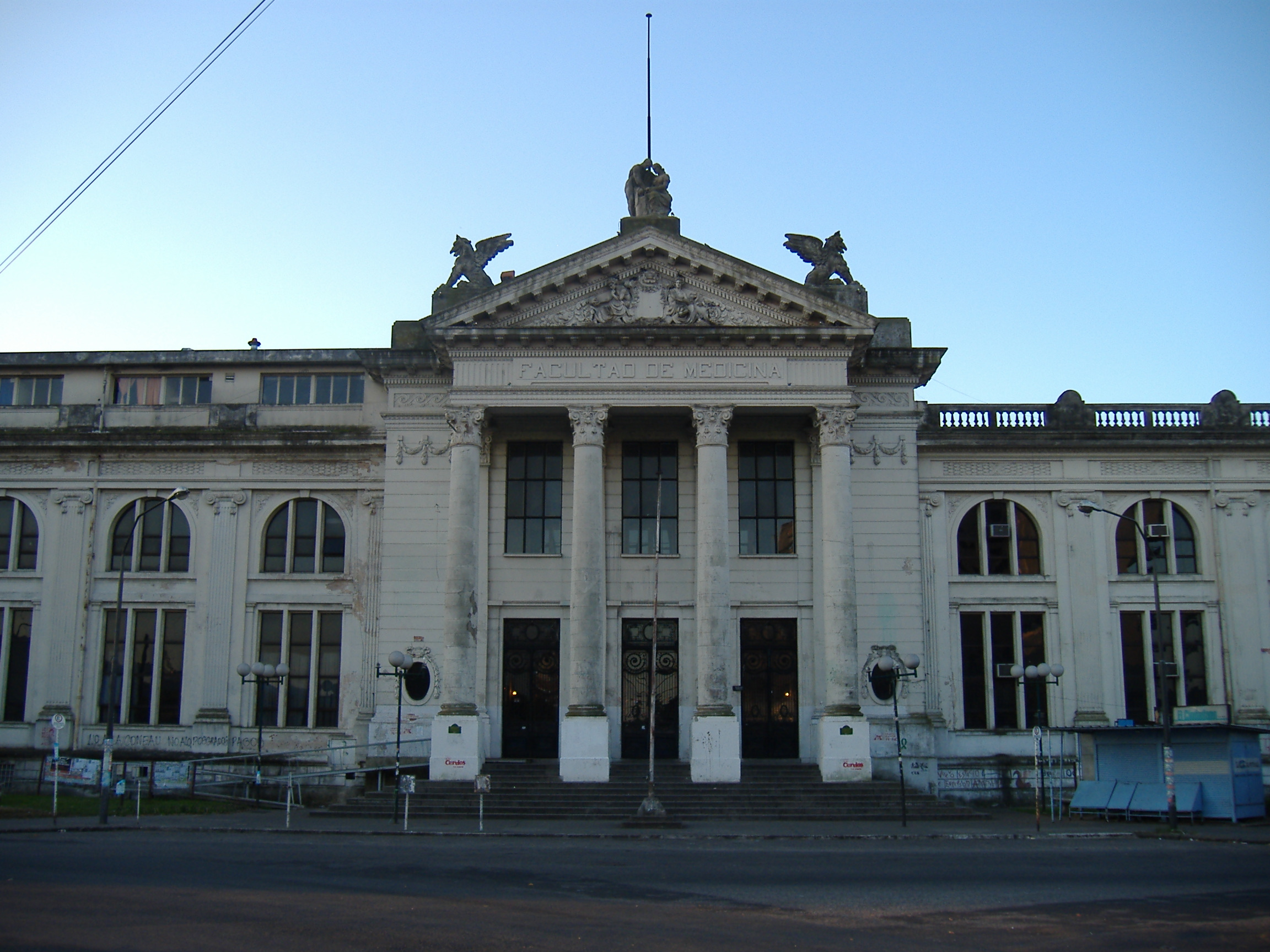
The Faculty of Medicine of the UNR

On 16 May 1969 the students of the Faculty of Medicine of the Universidad Nacional de Rosario expressed their rejection of such actions; other faculties joined them. The rector suspended university activities until next Monday. The next day a protest started at the cafeteria of the UNR. The police put down the demonstration and killed student Adolfo Bello. The CGT labour union called for a "status of alert", and Bello's murder was denounced by the public.

On 20 May, the students of Rosario announced a national strike (similar protests took place in other provinces). On 21 May, university student groups and secondary school students, along with the CGT, organized a silent march, which gathered 4,000 people. The police sent to put down the protest had to retreat, but killed 15-year-old student Luis Blanco. This was later known as the first Rosariazo. That evening the city was declared an emergency zone under military jurisdiction. A massive worker strike was declared on 23 May in Rosario and the nearby Industrial Corridor. Blanco's funeral was attended by more than 7,000 people.

On 29 May there was a general strike in the city of Córdoba, which brought police repression and a civil uprising, an episode later termed the Cordobazo. The next day the CGT called for national strike.

The May Revolution commemoration on 25 May was marked by the refusal of many priests to celebrate the traditional Te Deum in Rosario and nearby towns. In the celebration of the National Flag Day (20 June), President Onganía customarily visited Rosario and was declared persona non grata.

== Second Rosariazo ==
After a few months of relative calm, Rosario university students started a series of protests and memorials commemorating the victims of state repression on 7 September 1969.

Upon the suspension of a railroad labour union deputy, Mario Horat, the railroad workers of Rosario went on strike on 8 September; on 12 September the union declared a nationwide indefinite strike. The government enlisted the military for repression. Several factories were occupied in Córdoba, and there was a massive uprising in Cipolletti, Río Negro.

On 15 September the CGT of Rosario declared a strike, and on the morning of the next day the workers marched on the city. Street fighting and repression were widespread throughout the city. Between 100,000 and 250,000 people are estimated to have taken part in the protests, which later came to be known as the Second Rosariazo (or the Proletarian Rosariazo). The workers converged on the seat of the CGT and were joined by students, who had previously gathered at the faculties.

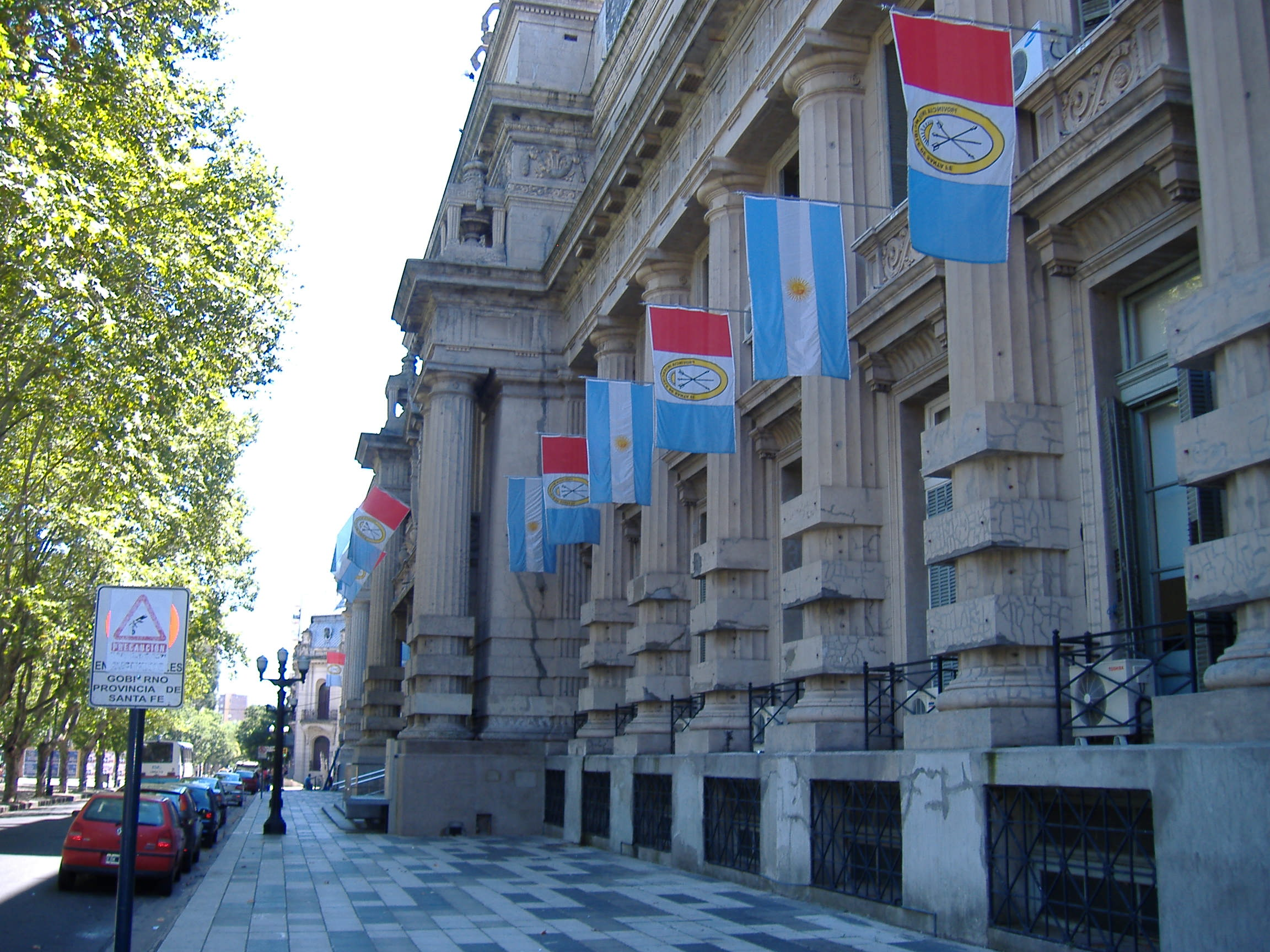
The former Police Headquarters of Rosario, now a delegation of the provincial government

The police were eventually overwhelmed by the protesters, who set up barricades and re-grouped in many different points throughout the city. Public transport vehicles were set on fire. Police control was limited to a few important buildings such as the Command Seat of the Second Army Corps, the Police Headquarters, the courts and the major radio stations. The conflict then spread to the barrios on the outskirts of Rosario.

In light of the deteriorating situation, on 17 September the Army took charge. Colonel Leopoldo Galtieri (who would later become president of the military regime in 1981) was among the Army personnel involved in the repression. That evening, the Commander of the II Army Corps, Brig Gen. Herbert Robinson released the following statement: "The public is warned that in this mission, my troops are under orders to fire without warning on any outrage or attack." (Antenore 2004) From that point forward, the fight was effectively lost for the protesters. The Rozariazo ended with hundreds dead or wounded, and many arrested.

The power of President Onganía was weakened by the Rosariazo and the Cordobazo, to the point that the dominant military faction asked him to resign, which he refused to do. He was forced out of office by a military junta on 8 June 1970.

== See also ==
- History of Rosario
- History of Argentina
- Caracazo
- Cordobazo
- Bogotazo
- List of cases of police brutality in Argentina
