= Fernando Traverso's Bicis =

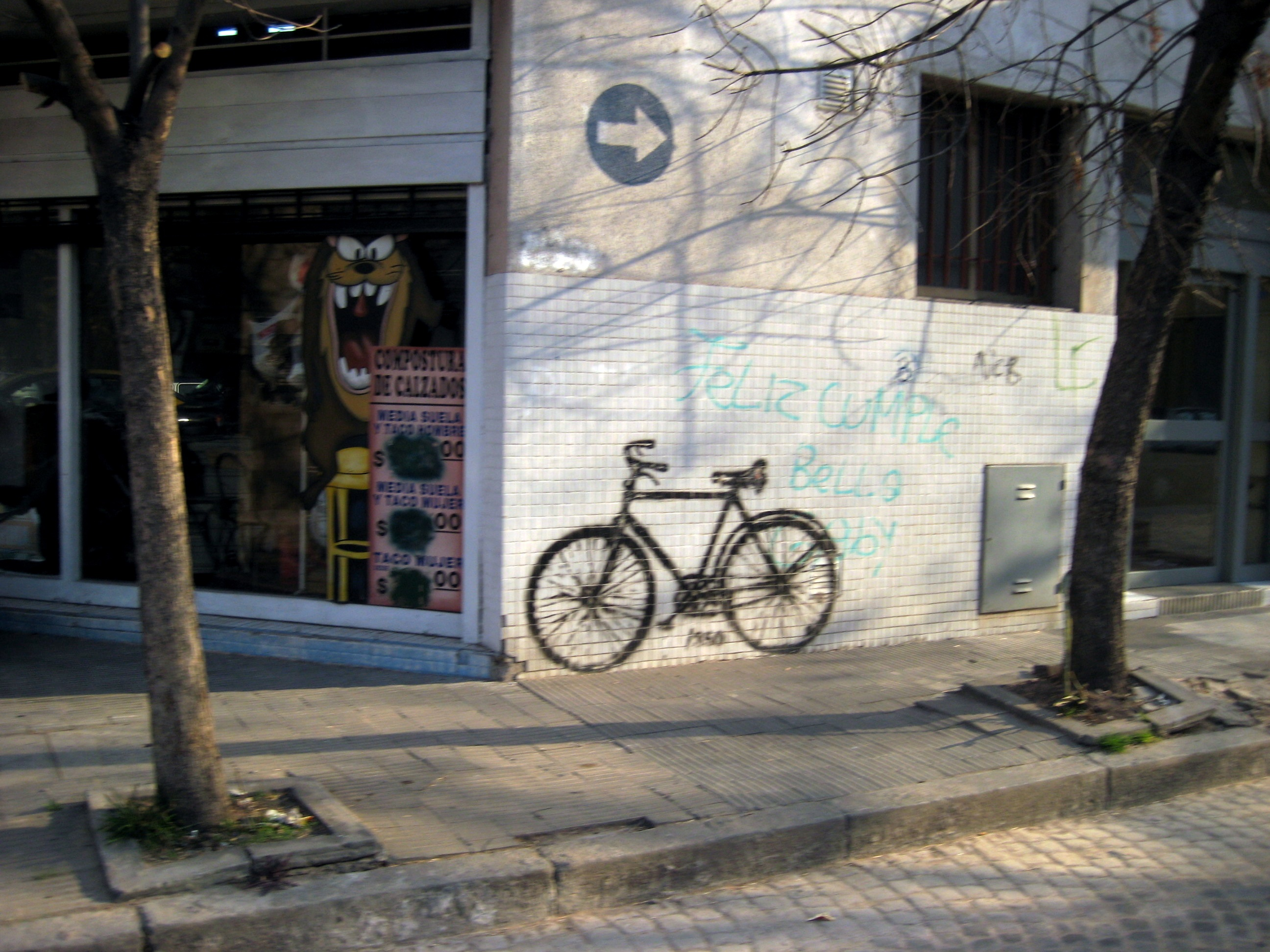
Bici in Rosario

On March 24, 2001, Fernando Traverso, an Argentinian hospital worker, political activist, and artist, began spray painting a series of twenty-nine life-sized bicycle stencils throughout the streets of his home town Rosario as a symbolic memorial to his twenty-nine friends who were abducted, tortured and killed during Argentina's Dirty War. Today, there are 350 bici stenciled images painted on buildings throughout Rosario, memorializing each of its 350 citizens who were disappeared under Argentina's military dictatorship and National Reorganization Process (1976–1983).

== Background ==
For most members of the resistance, bicycles were the primary mode of transport. As Traverso's friends began disappearing after the 1976 coup d'etat of Isabel Perón and the ensuing Jorge Rafael Videla Redondo de facto presidency, only their bicycles would be left behind. Seeing an abandoned bicycle was often the first sign that its owner had been disappeared. These bicycles left standing in the streets of Rosario stood as memorials to those who were taken. Traverso made these memorials more permanent by spray painting the bici image on buildings throughout the city. Now, it has spread worldwide and Traverso works with many human rights organizations as well as impacted communities to raise awareness for those who are still disappearing today.

== Memory Art ==
In the years following the Dirty War, Argentinians have dealt with the atrocities of the past in a myriad of ways. From the 1984 state-sponsored Nunca Más (Never Again) truth commission to commemoration museums, memories of Argentina's brutal dictatorial past have far from disappeared; rather the opposite, they have come to dominate various arenas of Argentine culture, most notably, Argentine memory art As exemplified through the successes of Traverso's bici graffiti art campaign, memory art has become an important symbolic means of negotiating the past, not only by the artist and the affected community, but the international population as well.

Alongside Traverso's graffiti art, Rosario is also home to Argentina's first official Museum of Memory which offers a nuanced narration of the nations dictatorial past. Under the direction of Ruben Chababo, the Museum of Memory opened firstly in 2004, and then in a more permanent location in 2010. Since its original opening, issues of interpretation have been paramount in its organization. As a means to avoid the implied "before" and "after" connotations of a chronological portrayal, the Museum is organized by a series of aesthetics themes ranging from clandestine imprisonments to struggles in truth and justice. However, Chababo has remarked that Rosario's true memory art cannot be found in any institution, but rather in its streets.

== The Bici as memorial ==
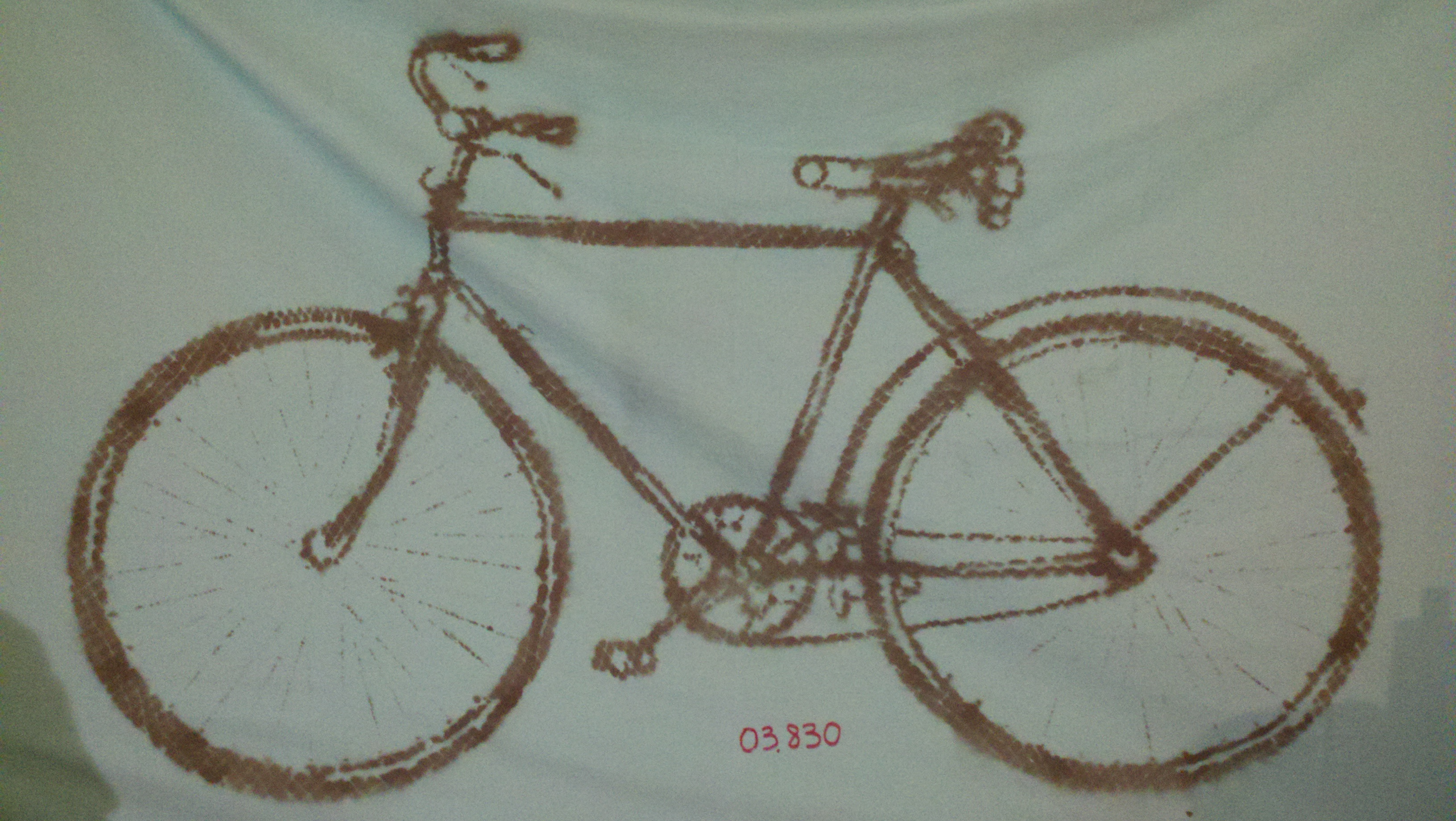
Bici banner

Fernando Traverso's Bici image could originally only be found in the streets of Rosario, but has since become an international symbol remembering those who disappeared under the various military dictatorships in Latin America, specifically during the 1970s. Traverso's memorial has transformed Rosario's urban space into a place of memory and is one of many political memorials in Argentina and in Latin America [See External Links].

Traverso visited the US-Mexico border from May 25 through June 1, 2009 to attend the inaugural event for the exhibition of The Disappeared. During his visit he met with and held workshops for students from the Universidad Autónoma de Ciudad Juárez (UACJ) in Ciudad Juárez, Mexico, and the University of Texas at El Paso (UTEP). Traverso, along with Rubin Center Assistant Director Kerry Doyle and UACJ Visual Arts Professor Leon de la Rosa, came up with Bicycles on the Border, an action using Traverso's bici image to respond to the current border realities. He held two daylong workshops at both universities, during which groups of students and community members printed images of bikes on large fabric banners. Those who participated in the action were encouraged to take the banners and take pictures of them in places along the border that evoke the ideas of disappearance, loss, or injustice that have come to be associated with the bici image.

These photographs became his next project, El Nieto de Herminia (Herminia's Grandson). The image of the bici came to represent those who were disappeared. Family photos were taken with the bici in place of the missing relative. The original memorial started off small but "his art has spiraled outward, enmeshing more and more participants."

His most recent project involves numbering real bicycles. He is encouraging cyclists to rescue abandoned bikes. The bici images are a reminder of the disappeared. In Traverso's word's, "forgetting becomes the repressor's ultimate triumph."

== See also ==
- History of Argentina
- National Reorganization Process
- Dirty War
- Operation Condor
- National Commission on the Disappearance of Persons (CONADEP)
- Human Rights in Argentina
- Street art
