= Biblioteca Argentina Dr. Juan Álvarez =

Public library in Rosario, Argentina

Biblioteca Argentina Dr. Juan Alvarez
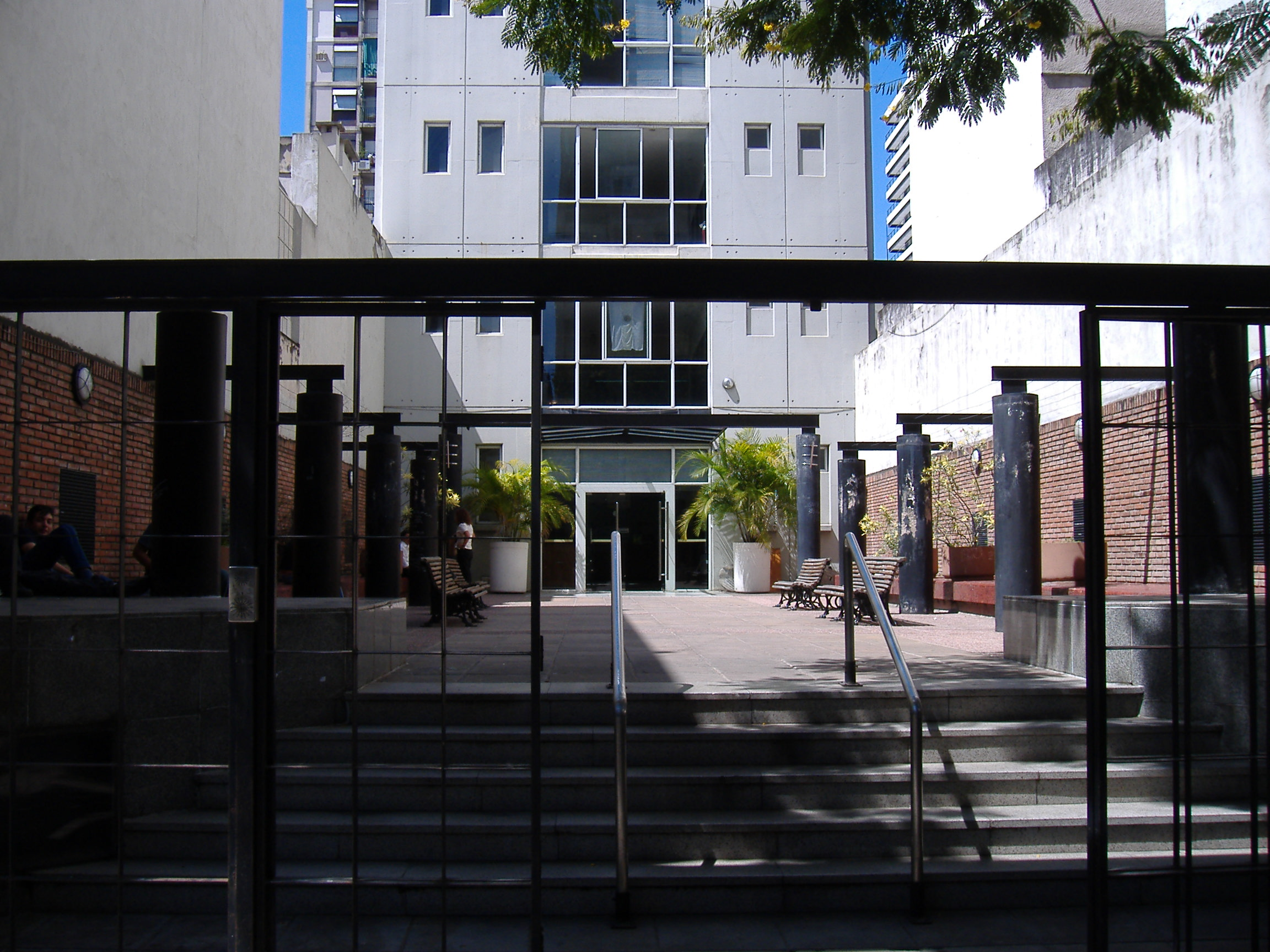
- The main entrance to the library, on 731 Presidente Roca St.
- 32.94460629826837°S 60.644119494364915°W
- Location: Santa Fe, Argentina
- Established: 1913

Other information
- Website: http://biblioargentina.gob.ar/web/

The Biblioteca Argentina Dr. Juan Álvarez is a public library in Rosario, Argentina. It is the most important library in the city and in the province of Santa Fe.

The library houses 186,000 books. It has three floors and includes a reading room for 190 people, a reading service for the blind, and photocopy and free Internet services. There is also a children's section, a multimedia library, and a bookbinding section. A newspaper and magazine annex (Hemeroteca) is located on a separate building around the block.

== History ==
The library was founded in 1913 by judge and historian Juan Álvarez (1878–1954), who in 1909 addressed mayor Isidro Quiroga: "In this city of 200,000 inhabitants there is not a single public library that is capable of fulfilling with dignity the role assigned to such establishments." On 1909-10-11 the project was authorized and the construction began at the Patio del Mercado, across Pasaje Centeno (now a small street called Pasaje Juan Álvarez). The library was officially inaugurated on 1912-07-24. At the time the Head of the La Plata University, Joaquín V. González, stated in a lecture what was to be the motto of the library, "To know is to love, to ignore is to hate."; this motto is printed on the entrance of the Reading Room.

On that same year a group of people, El Círculo de la Biblioteca was formed, with the purpose of organizing concerts, lectures, and art exhibitions and meetings. El Círculo had no fixed seat until 1943, when they acquired the badly deteriorated facilities of the La Ópera Theater (which was about to be demolished), then renamed El Círculo Theater.

The newspaper and magazine deposit was inaugurated in 1949. That year the library was also transferred to the municipality. The name of Juan Álvarez, the founder, was added to the library's in 1956, two years after his death.

The continuous growth of the library required several reforms, until the building had to be completely restored and remodeled. It acquired its present structure in 1989.

== UN Depository Library ==
The Biblioteca Argentina is an official Depository Library (DL-138) of the United Nations System (DEPOLIB) since April 1957.
