= Roque Sáenz Peña Hospital =

Geography
- Location: Rosario, province of Santa Fe, Argentina
- Coordinates: 32.999237°S 60.646928°W

Organisation
- Type: Municipal

History
- Opened: 20 August 1923

Links
- Lists: Hospitals in Argentina

The Roque Sáenz Peña Hospital (in Spanish, Hospital Dr. Roque Sáenz Peña) is a public municipal hospital in Rosario, province of Santa Fe, Argentina. It serves as a secondary referral hospital for the South and Southwest Districts of the city.

The hospital is structured around three main areas:

- Children's health area: pediatrics, neonatology, pediatric ER
- Adults' area: several specialties, general ER
- Women's area: birthing center, gynaecology, tocogynaecologic ER

The hospital's labor ward serves an average of 1,800 annual births. This area has a programme for the promotion of breastfeeding, for which it received the award of Mother and Child-Friendly Hospital (Hospital Amigo de la Madre y el Niño) from UNICEF Argentina.

== History ==
The establishment of a sanitary and first aid facility in the south of Rosario was first decided in 1921. The healthcare center officially opened on 20 August 1923 at its current location. In 1933, It was named after former president Roque Sáenz Peña. A maternity ward, previously located in a separated building, was transferred to the hospital in 1961.
