= Ovidio Lagos =

Argentine journalist and politician (1825–1891)

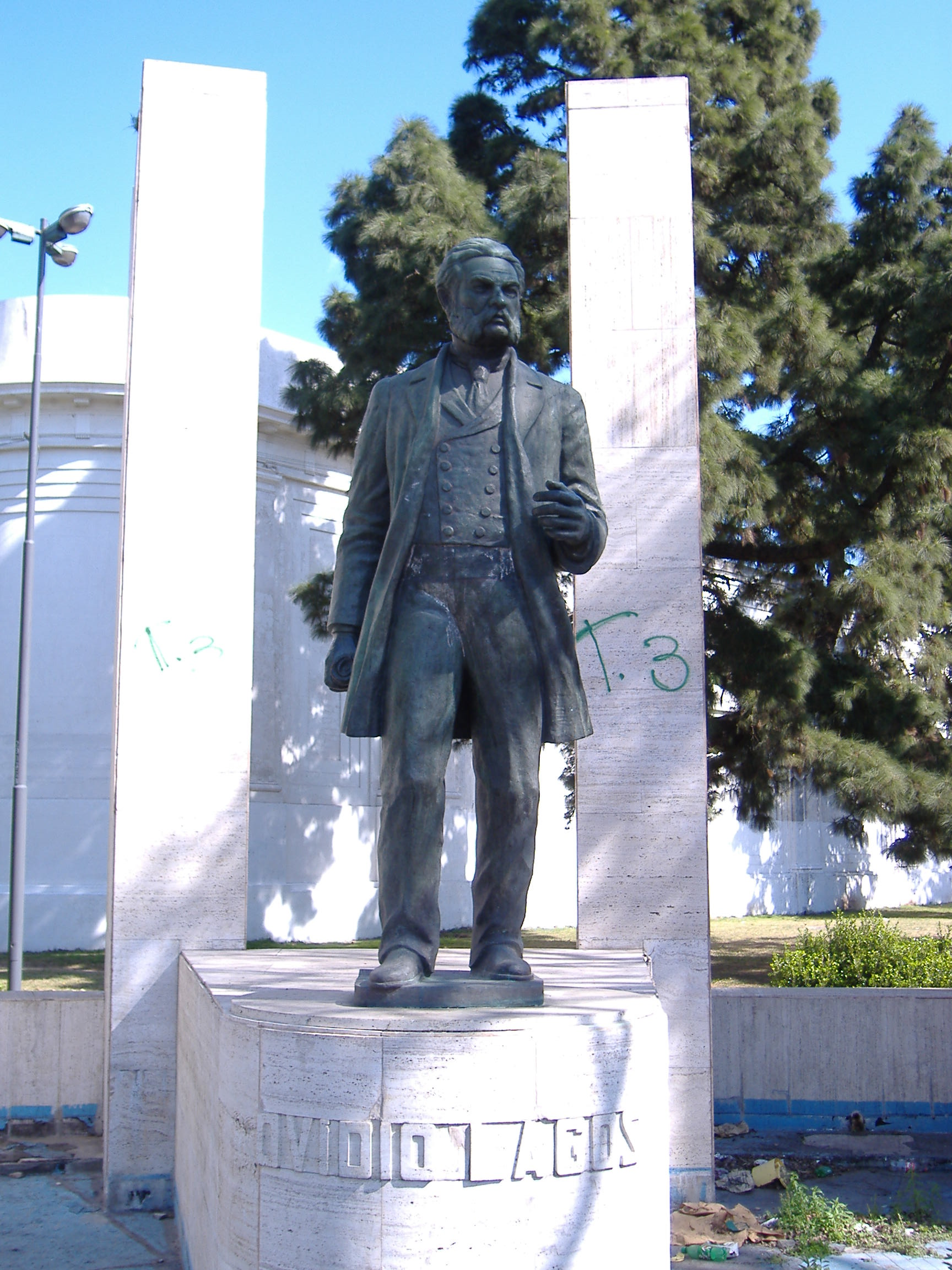
Monument dedicated to Ovidio Lagos in Rosario

Ovidio Lagos (31 August 1825 – 13 August 1891) was an Argentine journalist, businessman and politician.

Lagos was born in Buenos Aires in a country torn apart by internal strife. Federalists, who supported the view of Argentina as a confederation of self-ruled provincial states, fought Unitarians, who wanted a national government centralized in and controlled from Buenos Aires.

Lagos worked as a clerk and then as a typographist in a state printing press, under the government of Juan Manuel de Rosas. Though nominally federalist, Rosas worked mainly to secure power for himself (and by extension, for Buenos Aires). Lagos, a supporter of the federalist cause, got into trouble and was forced to flee to Paraná, Entre Ríos. Rosas was ousted by a former ally, Justo José de Urquiza, in 1852.

Lagos came back to Buenos Aires and advocated the re-joining of the city with the Argentine Confederation. He then became an editor and columnist in a newspaper, and wrote supporting the proposal, launched by Buenos Aires Deputy Manuel Quintana on 1 July 1867, to move the seat of the federal authorities to the city of Rosario, 300 km away from Buenos Aires, on the Paraná River. President Urquiza, interviewed by Lagos, sponsored the idea and provided funding for a newspaper to advocate this cause in Rosario. On November 15 of that year the first edition of the La Capital newspaper was published.

Lagos defended his political convictions vehemently, which caused La Capital to be shut down by the authorities on several occasions. On 13 May 1877 Lagos was arrested for ten days.

In 1887 Lagos was elected as a national representative (diputado) for the province of Santa Fe. He died in 1891, at age 65.

== Legacy ==
In Rosario, now a major urban center, Lagos is acknowledged as a champion of the cause of federalism and against the concentration of political power in Buenos Aires. One of the main avenues in the city carries Lagos's name, and a monument is dedicated to him.

La Capital, which he founded, is the oldest newspaper in the country that is still being published. The Lagos family controlled it for 130 years, until 1997, when the share majority was acquired by media group Grupo Uno (controlled by businessman Daniel Vila and former Menem-administration Interior Minister José Luis Manzano).

== Sources ==
- Short biography from La Capital newspaper, online edition, commemorating the 180th anniversary of the birth of its founder.
