= Congreso de laS LenguaS =

2004 cultural event in Rosario, Argentina

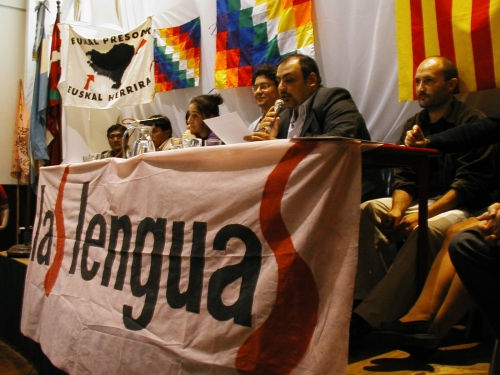
A lecture during the Congreso de laS LenguaS (note the official banner).

The Congreso de laS LenguaS (Spanish, Congress of the Languages) was a cultural event that took place in Rosario, Argentina, from 15 November to 20 November 2004. It was a series of meetings and lectures devoted to the discussion of cultural and linguistic diversity in Latin America, intended initially as indirect criticism and counter-event for the Third International Congress of the Spanish Language which was being celebrated at about the same time. It was presided over by the 1980 Nobel Peace Prize Adolfo Pérez Esquivel.

The very name of the Congreso attempted to emphasize the plurality of traditions of the region, over the de facto dominant status of Spanish brought about by the colonization and the ensuing decimation of the indigenous languages of the Americas. It is due to this emphasis that the S marking the plural in the article las "the" and the noun lenguas "tongues, languages" is in uppercase.

Rodolfo Hachén, a professor of ethnolinguistics at the National University of Rosario and one of the organizers, stated that they objected the Third International Congress of the Spanish Language because it was intended to affirm the appropriation of Spanish by the Association of Spanish Language Academies, which officially regulates the language. Hachén countered that the only "owners" of a language are its speakers. The organizers of the Third Congress pointed out that such criticism are out of date, since the Association of Spanish Language Academies has revised its policies on the acceptance of linguistic innovation and variants.
