= La Capital =

Newspaper from Rosario, Argentina

- "The columns of La Capital belong to the people" Spanish: "Las columnas de La Capital pertenecen al pueblo"
- Type: Daily newspaper
- Format: Tabloid
- Owner: Grupo América
- Founder(s): Ovidio Lagos; Eudoro Carrasco
- Publisher: Orlando Vignatti
- Editor: Editorial Diario LA CAPITAL S.A.
- Founded: 15 November 1867
- Headquarters: Rosario, Argentina
- Circulation: 40,000
- Website: www.lacapital.com.ar

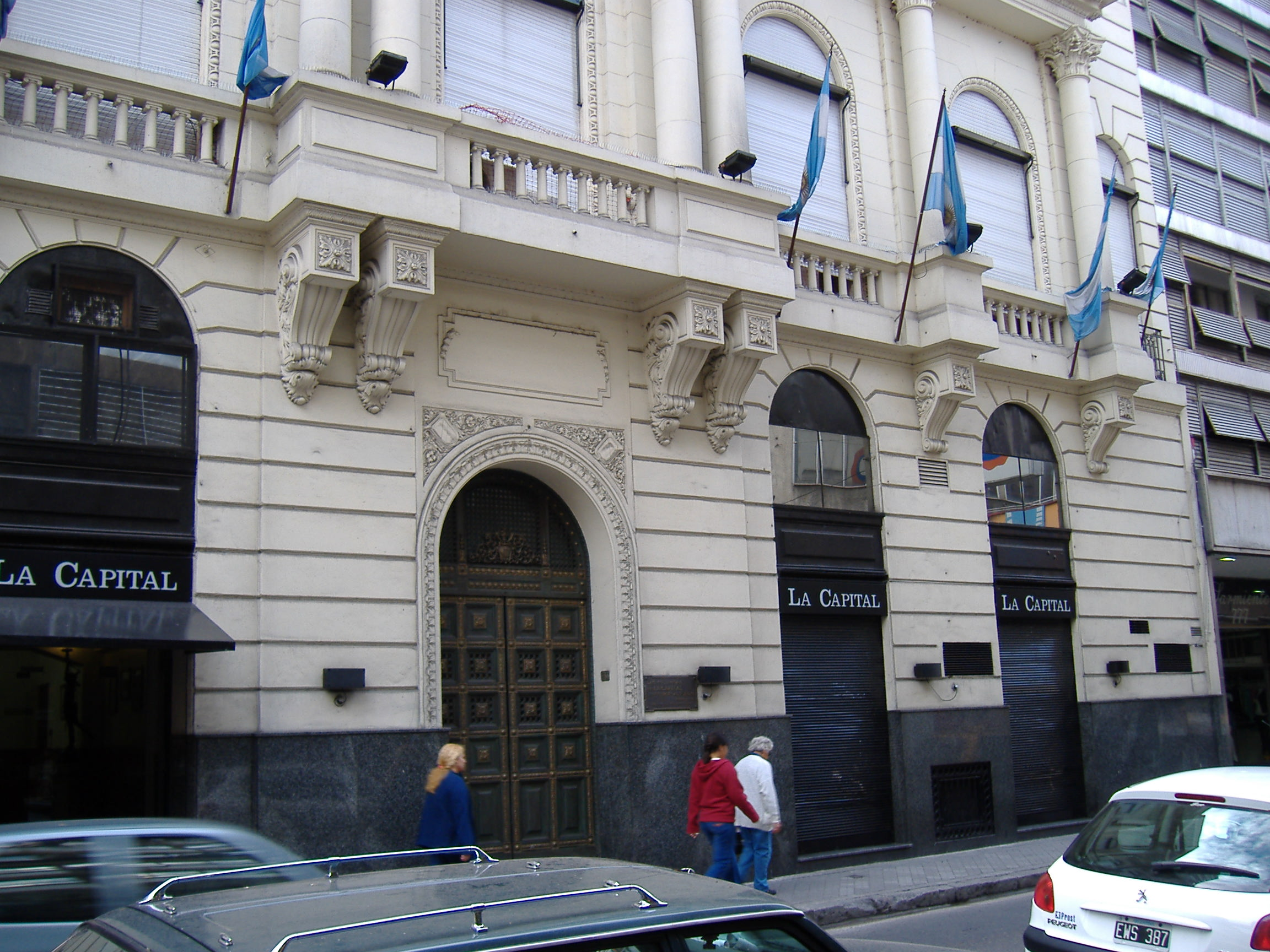
Offices of La Capital on Sarmiento St., Rosario

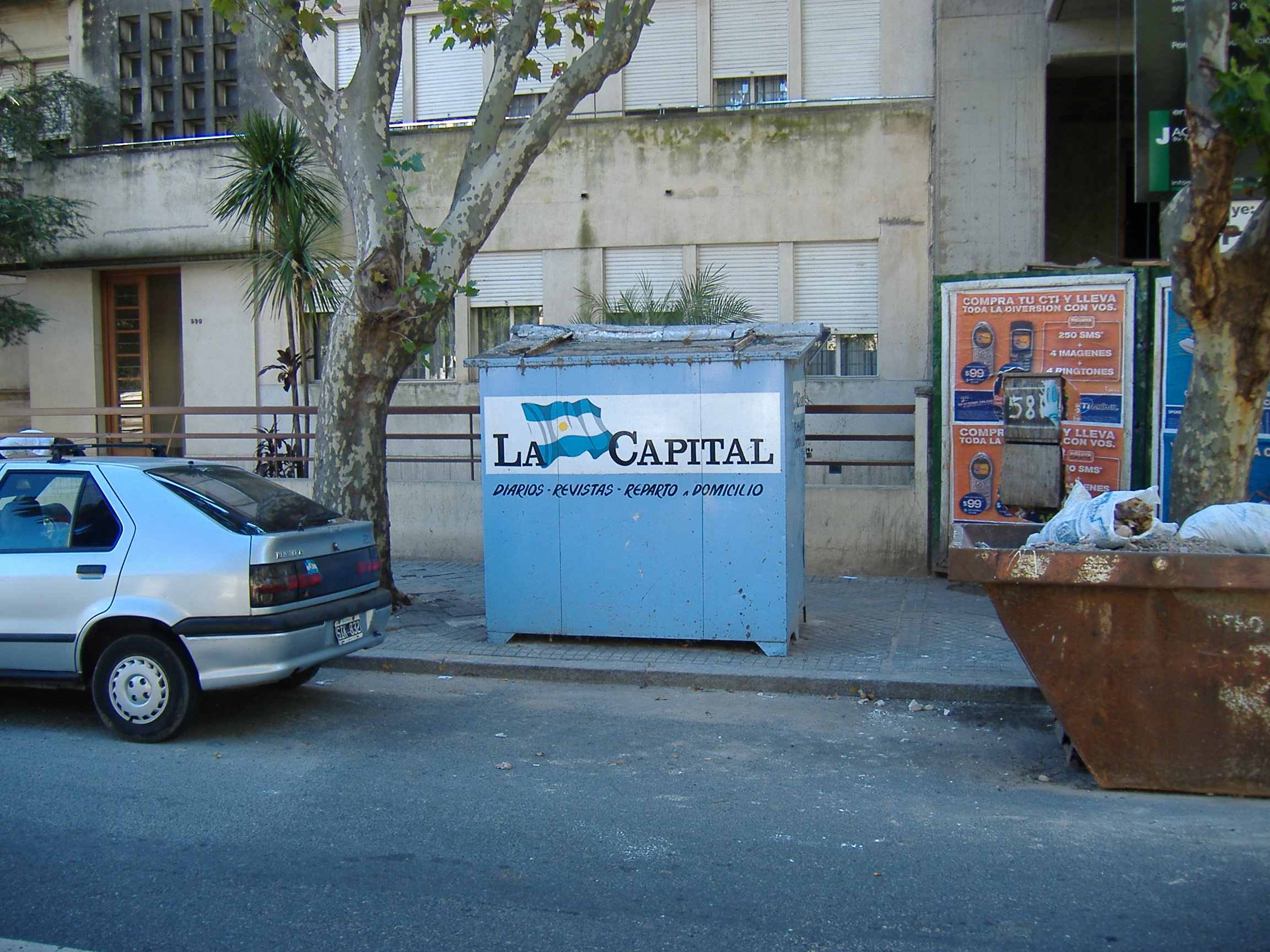
A newsstand sponsored by La Capital.

La Capital is a daily Spanish-language newspaper edited and published in Rosario, province of Santa Fe, Argentina. It was founded on 15 November 1867, and it is the oldest Argentine newspaper still in circulation, which has gained it the title of Decano de la Prensa Argentina ("Dean of the Argentine Press").

The name was chosen by its founder, Ovidio Lagos, as a political statement on the part of those, including him, who were lobbying to move the capital of the federal government to Rosario. Rosario was in fact declared the capital three times by Congress, only to face presidential vetoes each time.

At the time of its foundation, La Capital was an afternoon newspaper. Newspapers were just forums of political debate with classified ads. Since the beginning, the heading of La Capital included a motto showing a commitment to public opinion: Las columnas de La Capital pertenecen al pueblo, "La Capital's columns belong to the people".

On 19 August 1868 the editorial building was at 104 Santa Fe St. After that, La Capital turned into a morning newspaper, and in 1870 it moved to Port St. (now Buenos Aires St.). In 1874 and again in 1887 new printing machinery was acquired. In 1889 the editorial moved to a new building at 763 Sarmiento St. and acquired a French Marinoni reaction printer.

In 1903 the newspaper changed the format of its pages, abandoning the large sheet sizes. By 1905 the daily edition had 16 pages, and in 1906 it offered a full-color 28-page illustrated supplement.

For 111 years, since its foundation, the newspaper employed the "hot type" method, that is, with Linotype typesetting machines where molten lead and antimony were used to cast each line of text. In 1978 La Capital shifted to "cold type", using the phototypesetting method.

In mid-1998 the new publishing plant at Santiago St. near Rivadavia Ave. received its latest innovation, a Goss Urbanite rotating press which weighs 165 tonnes and measures almost 36 m in length. The new plant also features a number of other technologies. Using this, La Capital started a new edition, with a different layout and format, and fully in color.

Besides national and international news, the newspaper covers local news from Rosario and its metropolitan area (Greater Rosario), plus other towns in the region and four other provinces besides Santa Fe, reaching about 2 million readers.
