= Third International Congress of the Spanish Language =

The Third International Congress of the Spanish Language (Tercer Congreso Internacional de la Lengua Española) was a cultural event that took place in Rosario, Argentina, on November 17-19, 2004.

The main topics of the Congress were three: ideological and sociological aspects of linguistic identity; identity and language in literary creation; and the internationalization of Spanish.

== Guests and lecturers ==
Representing Spain, the Congress was attended by the King Juan Carlos I and the Queen Sofía; Argentine President Néstor Kirchner represented the national government. The presidents of Colombia and Mexico, as well as other important representatives of Spanish-speaking countries, were also present.

As guest lecturers there were the writers Carlos Fuentes, Nobel Prize winner José Saramago, Ernesto Cardenal, and Ernesto Sábato. The Rosario-born novelist, comics artist and humorist Roberto Fontanarrosa broke the ice in a debate about the importance of insults in interpersonal communication.

== Criticism ==
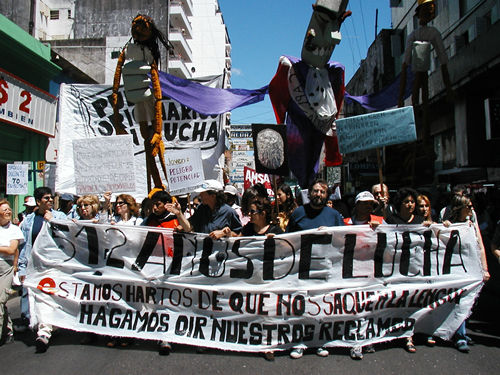
A demonstration protesting the cultural and linguistic dominance legacy of the Spanish conquest.

The Congress met opposition on the part of activist groups representing some linguistic and ethnic minorities, and became a focus for the confluence of many movements related to the left, from anti-globalization sympathizers to revisionists of the historic role of Spain and the Church in the colonization of the Americas (and the ensuing decline of native languages and cultures). The beginning of the Congress was protested by a large demonstration.

In line with these protests, there was another gathering, the Congreso de laS LenguaS, to discuss linguistic and cultural diversity in the region. It was presided by Nobel Peace Prize Adolfo Pérez Esquivel.

== Sources ==
In Spanish unless otherwise noted:

- Educ.ar – Educational portal of the Argentine State.
- Congreso Internacional de la Lengua Española in the website of Liceus.com.
- Diario Hoy, La Plata, Argentina, 18 December 2004.
- Rosario en el éxito soñado, RosarioNet, 21 November 2004.
- Por el Congreso de la Lengua, habrá asueto administrativo. SinMordaza.com, 12 November 2004.
- Congreso de laS LenguaS.
