= Curto =

Curto is a surname originating from either Spain, Portugal or Italy. The following individuals have that surname:

- Frank Curto (1946–1971) chief horticulturist for the Pittsburgh Department of Parks and Recreation
  - Frank Curto Park, a sculpture-filled city park in Pittsburgh, Pennsylvania
- Héctor del Curto, Argentine tango bandoneon player.
- Juan Carlos Curto, Argentine judge
- Manuel Curto, Portuguese footballer
- Silvio Curto, Italian Egyptologist
- Víctor Curto, Spanish footballer

Fictional Characters

- Ray Curto, a fictional character on the HBO original series The Sopranos
