= Chunnenuggee Ridge Public Garden =

Botanical garden in Alabama, United States

Coordinates: 32.158720°N 85.638520°W

Chunnenuggee Ridge Public Garden was a botanical garden near Union Springs, Alabama. It was the first public garden in the state. The garden club that established it, Chunnenuggee Ridge Horticultural Society, is the oldest continuously operating garden club in the U.S.

A historical marker is located at the entrance to the site of the gardens. It was founded by women.
