= Garden club =

Gardening group

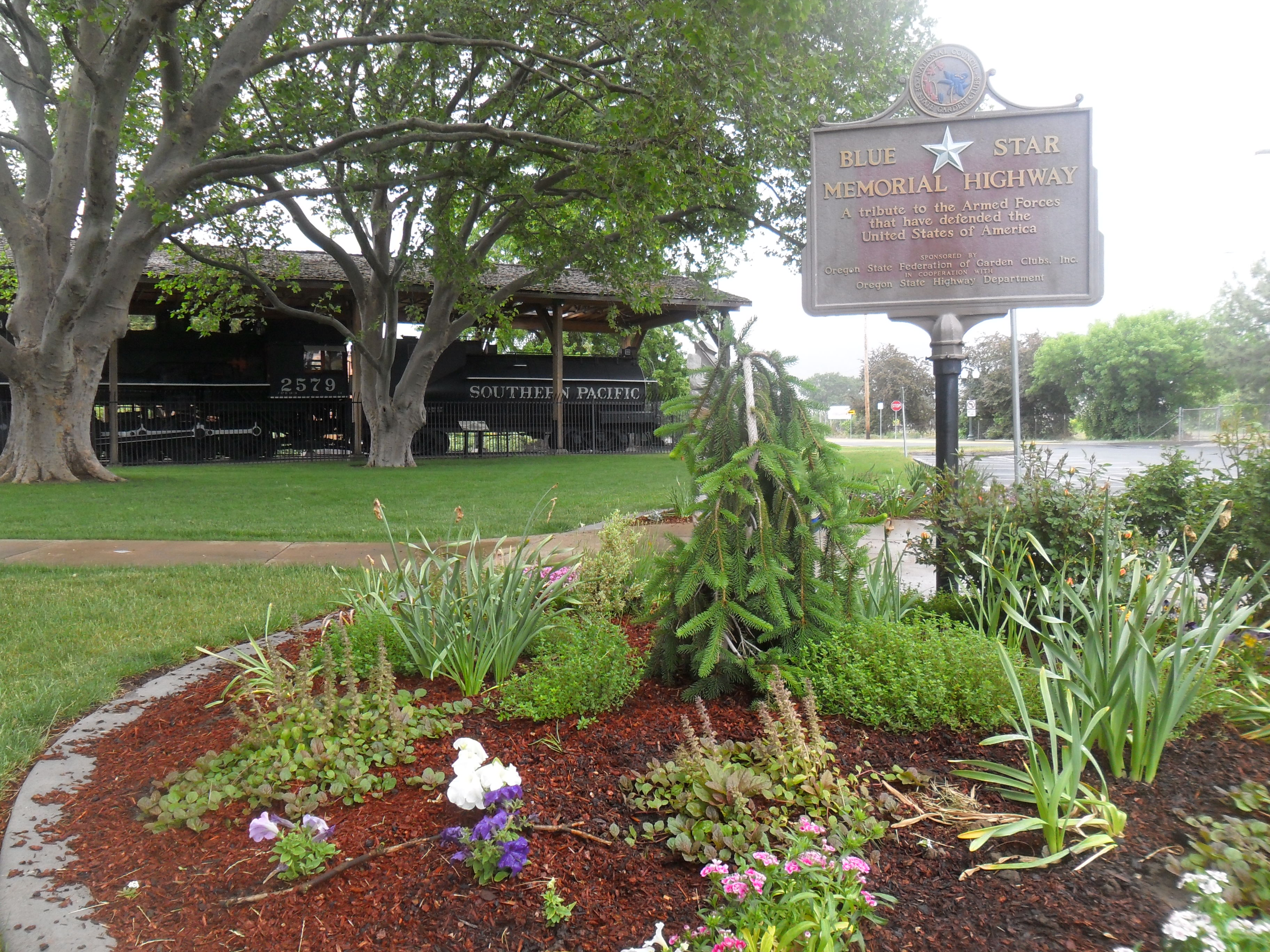
The Blue Star Memorial Highway program is an American garden club project to honor American military service members and veterans through plantings and markers adjacent to designated highways. The program was started in 1944 by the New Jersey Council of Garden Clubs to honor World War II service members and was adopted nationally in 1945 by the National Council of State Garden Clubs. It now honors service members of all time periods. This garden and marker are located in Oregon.

A garden club is an organized group of people with a shared interest in gardening, gardens, and plants. A flower club is a similar group with a focus on flowers.

== History ==
The club most commonly recognized as the first and oldest organized garden club in the United States is the Ladies' Garden Club of Athens, Georgia. It started in 1891 with a gathering of twelve women friends who shared plants and plant cuttings. It was formally organized the following year. However, two Massachusetts clubs predate the Athens club: The Floricultural Society (1889), later renamed the Plant Club, and The Garden Street Garden Club, formally organized in Cambridge on March 24, 1879. On January 29, 1889, the Cambridge Plant Club met, drafted by-laws, and elected officers. In 1931, the Massachusetts Horticultural Society honored it as "the first of its kind."

Garden clubs formed in other American communities. The growth of garden clubs was one manifestation of the broader women's club movement of the late 19th and early 20th centuries. In 1913, the first national federation of garden clubs, the Garden Club of America, was established. It was followed in 1929 by the National Council of State Garden Clubs, now National Garden Clubs By the 1930s, local garden clubs had formed in communities throughout the United States. Initially a women's activity, over time the garden club movement also engaged men, leading in 1932 to the establishment of the Men's Garden Clubs of America organization (now The Gardeners of America/Men's Garden Clubs of America).

Garden clubs did not limit themselves to the improvement of members' private gardens. Many clubs took an interest in civic beautification, planting trees along public streets, maintaining flower gardens in public spaces, and campaigning against billboards, which were considered "eyesores". The Garden Club of America began to crusade against billboards in 1919. Highway beautification and roadside improvement were a focus of attention for the Garden Club of Georgia from the time of its founding in 1928. In 1938 the Mississippi state garden club federation combined with the state federation of women's clubs and state roadside improvement council to campaign for state legislation to "get rid of ... unattractive signs and billboards that clutter the roads".

Many club members engaged in flower arranging as an activity. Clubs sponsored flower shows and club members participated in competitions as contestants and judges. This aspect of the American garden club movement led indirectly to the flower club movement in the United Kingdom in the years after World War II, when Julia Clements and other U.K. women who had observed flower arranging activities in North America returned home and encouraged their countrywomen to engage in similar activities.

== National organizations ==
Many local garden clubs in the United States are affiliated with one of three national organizations: the Garden Club of America, the National Garden Clubs (originally the National Council of State Garden Clubs), and The Gardeners of America/Men's Garden Clubs of America. In the United Kingdom, many local flower clubs are affiliated with the National Association of Flower Arrangement Societies. In 2023, the Garden Club of America had 199 member clubs in the U.S. and the National Garden Clubs organization had 4075 member clubs in the U.S.

== See also ==
- Archives of American Gardens
