= Litoral Gas =

Litoral Gas is the primary provider of natural gas to the city of Rosario, Santa Fe, in Argentina. It also distributes gas in all of the Santa Fe Province, and the northwest of the Buenos Aires Province, at the partidos San Nicolás, Ramallo, Pergamino, Colón, Bartolomé Mitre, San Pedro and Baradero.

Litoral Gas was established on December 28, 1992, after the privatization of Gas del Estado, with a license of 35 years, which may be extended to another 10.

At the end of 2024, the company served customers in around 730,000 residential addresses, as well as over 27,000 commercial or industrial customers. 85% of its customers are based in the province of Santa Fe. During that year, the company sold around 3.2 billion cubic metres of gas to its clients.

The company expects to deliver gas to 28,000 further homes in 2027 as well as serving more commercial consumers in the center of the province of Santa Fe, by finishing on-going work to expand its gas distribution network.

90 of the company shares are controlled by the Grupo TIBSA, which is in turn are to 70% controlled by Suez-Tractebel and by Techint, through its Tecpetrol International company. Suez-Trabeltec is the Argentine branch of the French GDF Suez.

Its role in the 2013 Rosario gas explosion is currently under investigation. The company offered an out-of-court settlement to victims of the explosion, which was initially widely rejected by the many families but by 2014 more than half them had accepted the settlement.
