= 2013 Rosario gas explosion =

Disaster in building in Argentina

Rosario gas explosion
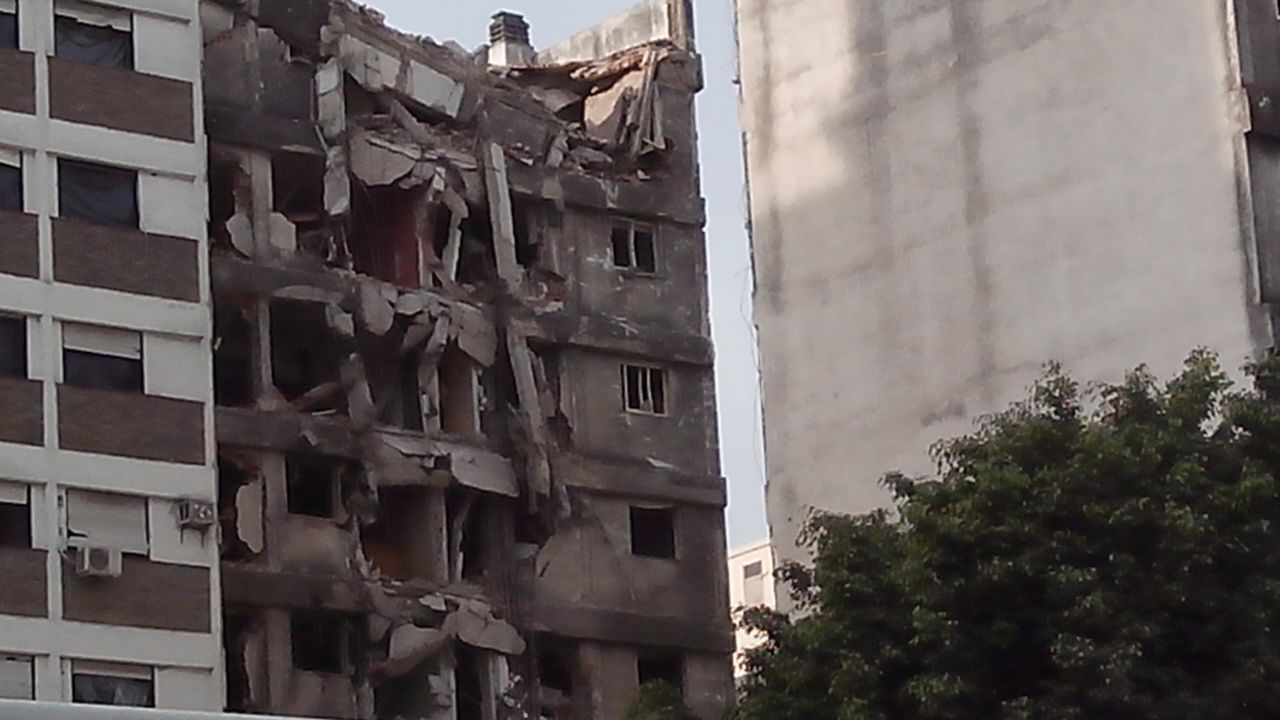
- Building before being demolished
- Date: August 6, 2013
- Time: 9:30 am
- Location: Rosario, Santa Fe, Argentina; 32.9372°S 60.6509°W
- Cause: Gas leak
- Deaths: 22
- Injuries: 60

A gas explosion caused by a large gas leak occurred in a residential area of Rosario, the third-largest city in Argentina, on August 6, 2013. A nearby building collapsed, and others were at high risk of structural failure. Twenty-two people died, and 60 were injured. Several organizations helped secure the area, search for survivors and aid people who lost their homes. Shortly after the explosion, the time needed for reconstruction was estimated at six months.

The provincial judiciary launched an investigation into the cause of the explosion. Primary suspects were Litoral Gas (the natural-gas provider for Rosario) and an employee who carried out maintenance work at the building that day. Several public figures sent condolences, and most of the candidates for the 2013 primary elections suspended their political campaigns.

== Explosion ==
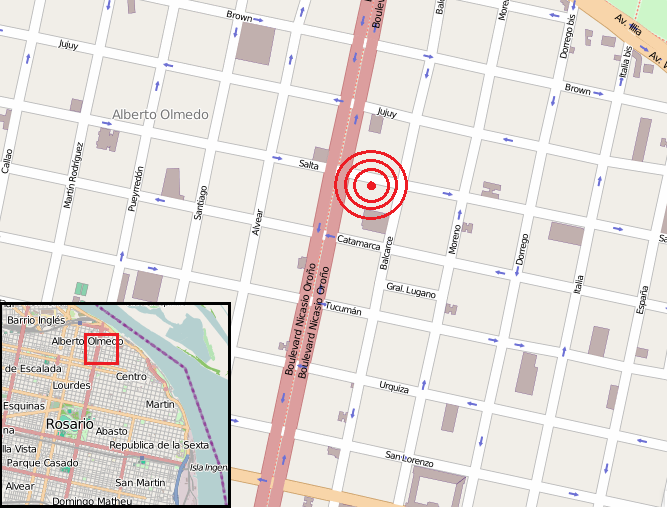
Location map

The explosion occurred at 9:30 a.m. near the intersection of Oroño and Salta Streets in central Rosario. Initial reports confirmed eight people dead, 60 injured and 15 missing; eight more deaths were later confirmed. Searches the following day revealed twelve fatalities, ten of whom were identified. Of the people who were missing, some were found dead among the debris, while others were rescued. The search for survivors ended on August 13, with 22 people confirmed dead. A 65-year-old woman who had been injured died on October 8.

The explosion was caused by a gas leak in a 30-year-old building. It severely damaged a nearby nine-story apartment building, causing it to collapse. Mónica Fein, mayor of Rosario, asked residents to avoid the area because of the risk that more buildings might collapse, and to ease the work of disaster management personnel. The streets were covered with broken glass from damaged buildings. Gas and electricity were immediately disconnected, and the national government sent an Argentine Federal Police task force to the scene.

The natural gas supplier, Litoral Gas, immediately began sealing the distribution pipe to the area. The Center for Ambulatory Medical Specialties of Rosario (Spanish: Centro de Especialidades Médicas Ambulatorias de Rosario) managed the information about the dead and injured, and tents were prepared for those left homeless. Firefighters and other workers found people trapped on the upper floors of buildings and evacuated them over adjacent roofs. Although the building was not destroyed by the explosion, a high risk of structural failure remained.

== Investigation ==
Neighbors reported to the press that they had smelled a gas leak several hours before the explosion and had called Litoral Gas. Company director José María González said that the company had received no such calls, and thought that callers might have dialed the 911 emergency number instead. Prosecutor Camporini reported at the trial that the building had experienced several gas leaks before the explosion.

The provincial judiciary launched an investigation into the circumstances surrounding the explosion. The prosecution conducted a search and seizure at the offices of Litoral Gas to confirm the absence of customer complaints about the gas leak. Judge Juan Carlos Curto ordered the arrest of Carlos Osvaldo García, an employee of the department responsible for gas service to the area. He was captured during the night, and his assistant Pablo Miño surrendered to police the following day. According to witnesses, one employee fled in a van before the explosion, when he realized the severity of the gas leak, while another remained to try to evacuate people from the endangered area. The van belonged to García, who experienced an acute stress reaction during the trial. Curto checked the remnants of the gas employee's workshop to verify García's testimony.

Prosecutor Graciela Argüelles said that, according to the investigation, Litoral Gas ignored calls for help from García, who was not properly trained to manage such a situation. The judge suggested that documents seized from Litoral Gas might prove the existence of customer reports of a gas leak. Curto thought that the employees might not bear sole responsibility, and that the liability of Litoral Gas had to be investigated as well.

Pablo Miño was released from prison, but Curto refused to release García, saying that Miño had extenuating circumstances which García did not. Miño's job was to give García the required tools, not to do the maintenance. He was in the street, watching over the van, which was not properly parked and locked, and did not see García's work before the explosion. Curto stopped short of pronouncing Miño innocent at that early stage.

As the case expanded beyond his jurisdiction, Curto recused himself from the trial and was replaced by Javier Beltramone, who released García from prison. Litoral Gas demanded Beltramone's recusal for expressing an opinion about the case to the press. The appeal court agreed in a 2–1 vote to remove Beltramone, and the case was transferred to Patricia Bilotta. García had claimed that he was following instructions received in the days before the explosion, so Bilotta summoned the technical officers of Litoral Gas to clarify that point. Litoral Gas said that García had not received any instructions prior to the explosion.

Litoral Gas proposed an out-of-court settlement to the relatives of the victims, offering about 1200 US dollars per square meter of collapsed building, in addition to compensation for loss of life. Vice Governor Jorge Henn rejected it as immoral, and most of the families also initially rejected the proposal. By May 2014, however, almost half of the families had accepted the settlement.

== Reaction ==
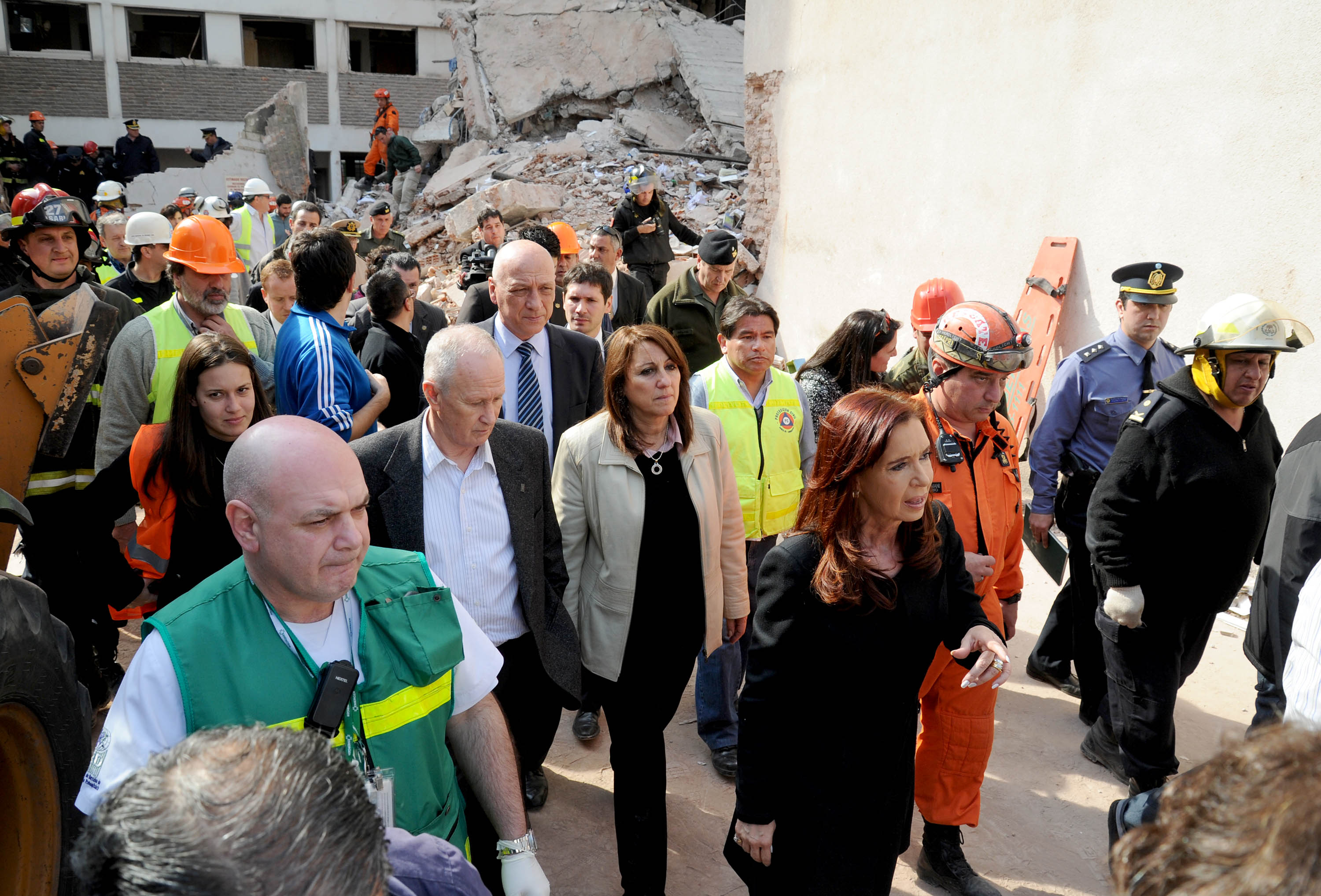
President Cristina Fernández de Kirchner and Mayor Mónica Fein at the site of the explosion

The explosion occurred shortly before the primary 2013 Argentine legislative elections on August 11. The governor of Santa Fe province, Antonio Bonfatti, asked the political parties to end their campaigns to allow mourning for the victims of the explosion. The Front for Victory and Progressive, Civic and Social Front candidates suspended their campaigns, and the national government declared two days of mourning. The period of mourning was observed by all candidates in Buenos Aires and most other provinces, who ended their political campaigns.

President Cristina Fernández de Kirchner, who had recently returned from a diplomatic visit to the United Nations, visited the site of the explosion on August 7. She was berated by local residents; some were angry because her surprise visit halted work at the site, and others thought her presence was politically motivated. The president stayed briefly, visited the CEMAR and met Bonfatti. Kirchner's entourage was surrounded by members of La Cámpora, who tried to prevent demonstrations against her and keep journalists and residents at bay.

Weeks before the explosion, several social networking sites had scheduled a country-wide cacerolazo (a pot-banging protest demonstration), known as 8A, against Kirchner for August 8. The websites had already conducted successful cacerolazos (8N and 18A). Despite the national mourning, the 8A protest went ahead as planned, with the added slogan "No more pointless deaths". Candidate Ricardo Gil Lavedra thought the cacerolazo should have been canceled, as the campaigning was, but fellow candidate Rodolfo Terragno supported it. It was attended by fewer people than previous ones in Buenos Aires and the rest of the country. The demonstration in Rosario was not a cacerolazo, but a silent candlelight vigil attended by nearly a hundred people. There was a second demonstration in Rosario on August 22, proceeding from the National Flag Memorial to the headquarters of Litoral Gas.

Pope Francis sent a letter of condolence to Archbishop José Luis Mollaghan of Rosario, and it was read during a mass and procession for Saint Cajetan at Plaza 25 de Mayo. Newell's Old Boys and Rosario Central, two local soccer teams and rivals in the Rosario derby, organized a charity match for the victims at the Gabino Sosa Stadium, and Rosario-born Lionel Messi provided support through the "Leo Messi" charity. The charity match collected 120,000 pesos. Musicians Fito Páez, Vicentico, Babasónicos, Las Pelotas, Chaqueño Palavecino, Ciro Pertusi, Lisandro Aristimuño, Pablo Dacal and Coki Debernardi performed concerts in several Argentine cities to raise money for the victims.

== Reconstruction ==
Bonfatti announced that Santa Fe province would provide financial help to the victims of the explosion. Since most houses in the vicinity were damaged, affected families would receive a subsidy of $20,000 to rent homes during reconstruction. They would receive $50,000 in credit to buy furniture and appliances, payable in 60 months with five percent interest. Rosario's real estate firms prepared a list of houses for rent without charging victims their regular fee. Some of the affected buildings may have had cheap insurances which would not cover the risk of an explosion. Some cars trapped in an underground parking lot could not be retrieved.

When the search for survivors ended, authorities closed Salta Street. Engineers began checking the buildings at ground zero, trying to restore the original layout of the street and demolishing unstable structures. Secretary of Public Works Omar Saab said that the two remaining buildings were beyond repair and had to be demolished. As a sign of respect, the demolition would not be carried out with explosives. Secretary of Housing Gustavo Leone estimated that the work would take nearly six months. People were allowed to enter their destroyed houses in small groups at a time, starting on August 9. Nearby streets began to be reopened on August 13.

The CGT union signed a deal with the association of factories of Rosario and the government of Rosario to make sure that all the victims of the explosions would keep their jobs.
