= Frank Curto =

Coordinates: 40.4512°N 79.9769°W

Frank S. Curto
- Born: 1898 or 1899
- Died: February 23, 1971 (aged 72–73)
- Education: Ohio State University (MS)
- Occupation: Horticulturist
- Known for: Chief horticulturist for Pittsburgh; foreman of Phipps Conservatory and Botanical Gardens
- Awards: Johnny Appleseed Award (1969); Sylvan Award (1970)

Frank S. Curto (1898 or 1899 – February 23, 1971) was the chief horticulturist for the Pittsburgh Department of Parks and Recreation.

Curto received his Master of Science degree in ornamental horticulture from Ohio State University. His career with the city's bureau of Parks and Recreation began in 1946 and ended in 1970 after a decade as foreman of Phipps Conservatory, where he directed the popular Fall Flower Shows for 23 years.

Throughout his life, Curto was active in several gardening societies. He was a member of the American Rhododendron Society and was active within its Great Lakes Chapter. He was also served as secretary-treasurer of the Pennsylvania Nurserymen's Association and as president of Pittsburgh Florists and Gardeners Club. He was a Director of the Men's Garden Club of America and won the association's Johnny Appleseed Award in 1969. The Society of American Florists bestowed him with the Sylvan Award in 1970.

== Legacy ==
Frank Curto Park, in Pittsburgh, Pennsylvania, was named for him, as he was the city's horticulturist for many years. Also, in Allegheny County, in the neighborhood of Oakland, a bridge on Forbes Avenue traversing Panther Hollow bears his name: the Frank Curto Bridge. A street in Pittsburgh, near the Phipps Conservatory in Schenley Park, is also named after him: Frank Curto Drive.

== Frank Curto Park ==
Frank Curto Park is a sculpture-filled city park in Pittsburgh, Pennsylvania, between Downtown and Polish Hill, alongside Bigelow Boulevard. The park contains a collection of works by contemporary urban artists and a flock of wild turkeys which began to occupy the park and surrounding hillside. It was named for Frank Curto, one of the city's longtime horticulturists. His career with the city's bureau of Parks and Recreation began in 1946 and ended in 1970 after a decade as foreman of Phipps Conservatory.

In 1977, a large yellow metal abstract sculpture by John Henry, entitled Pittsburgh, was installed.

In 1999, Stephanie Flom, a research fellow in Carnegie Mellon's STUDIO for Creative Inquiry, embarked on an art garden project, the Persephone Project, whose purpose was "to connect the public to art and the environment by promoting gardening as a contemporary art medium and recognizing gardeners as artists." Pittsburgh's mayor at the time, Tom Murphy, suggested Frank Curto Park, which was widely considered an unused resource.

In 2002, Philadelphia environmental artist Lily Yeh installed a 45-foot-diameter (14 m) circular garden, made entirely from plants donated by local communities. In the center of the circle stands Goddesses Adorned; three sculptures nearly twelve feet tall, designed by Yeh and crafted by Westmoreland County tree carver Joe King. Black enamel designs, developed at a local community workshop which Yeh conducted and painted by volunteers, adorn the statues.

In May 2005, Wisconsin sculptor Gail Simpson built her Broken Hardscape sculpture on the old exposed roadbed beside the main park's cinder walking path, using a pattern of hollow logs and plants that suggest the original paved road. The installation was commissioned by Carnegie Mellon University's STUDIO for Creative Inquiry's Persephone Project.

That same summer, about 100 yards away from Yeh's work, Vermont sculptor Dan Ladd installed a living sculpture consisting of three pairs of 14-foot sycamore trees, which he grafted into arches, framing different views of the city.

Frank Curto Park became the central venue for what is now known as the ArtGardens of Pittsburgh; a citywide undertaking of community-based art gardens populated with works by local artists. Sculptor Paul Bowden, who lives in Polish Hill, was chosen to install a garden there. Jorge Myers, who grew up in Hill District, was chosen to design and install another garden there. Each garden was filled with plants donated by the local communities. Flom called them "Magic Penny Gardens," after a folk song by Malvina Reynolds entitled "Magic Penny," dealing with both love and pennies, and the idea that the more one gives away, the more one receives.
