= Silvio Curto =

Italian Egyptologist

- Born: August 20, 1919; Bra, Italy
- Died: September 24, 2015 (aged 96); Turin, Italy
- Occupation: Egyptologist

Silvio Curto (August 20, 1919 – September 24, 2015) was an Italian Egyptologist.

== Biography ==
Born in 1919 in Bra, Piedmont, Curto obtained his degree in Roman archaeology in 1941. After the war, he became an inspector for the Soprintendenza alle Antichità Egizie and in 1964 he was appointed director of the Museo Egizio of Turin, a charge he held until 1984. During his term, the museum was renovated considerably and since 1969 it was provided with a large library.

Between 1961 and 1969 Curto led the Italian team of archaeologists who took part in the international effort of relocating the Abu Simbel temples which were threatened by the building of the Aswan High Dam. Italy received as a gift the small temple of Ellesyia, originally built by Thutmose III for the god Horus, which was rebuilt by Curto in 1970 inside the Museo Egizio in Turin, where it still is.
From 1964 to 1989 he taught Egyptology at the University of Turin. He also contributed to various Egyptian collections throughout Italy, such as renovating the one in the Museo Civico Archeologico of Bologna in 1961 and co-founding the Egyptian Museum of Milan in 1972.

Curto died on September 24, 2015, in Turin, aged 96. In 2016, the director of the Museo Egizio Christian Greco named the museum's library in his honor.

Preceded by Ernesto Scamuzzi	Director of the Museo Egizio; 1964–1984	Succeeded by Anna Maria Donadoni
