= Christian Greco =

Italian egyptologist and museum director (born 1975)

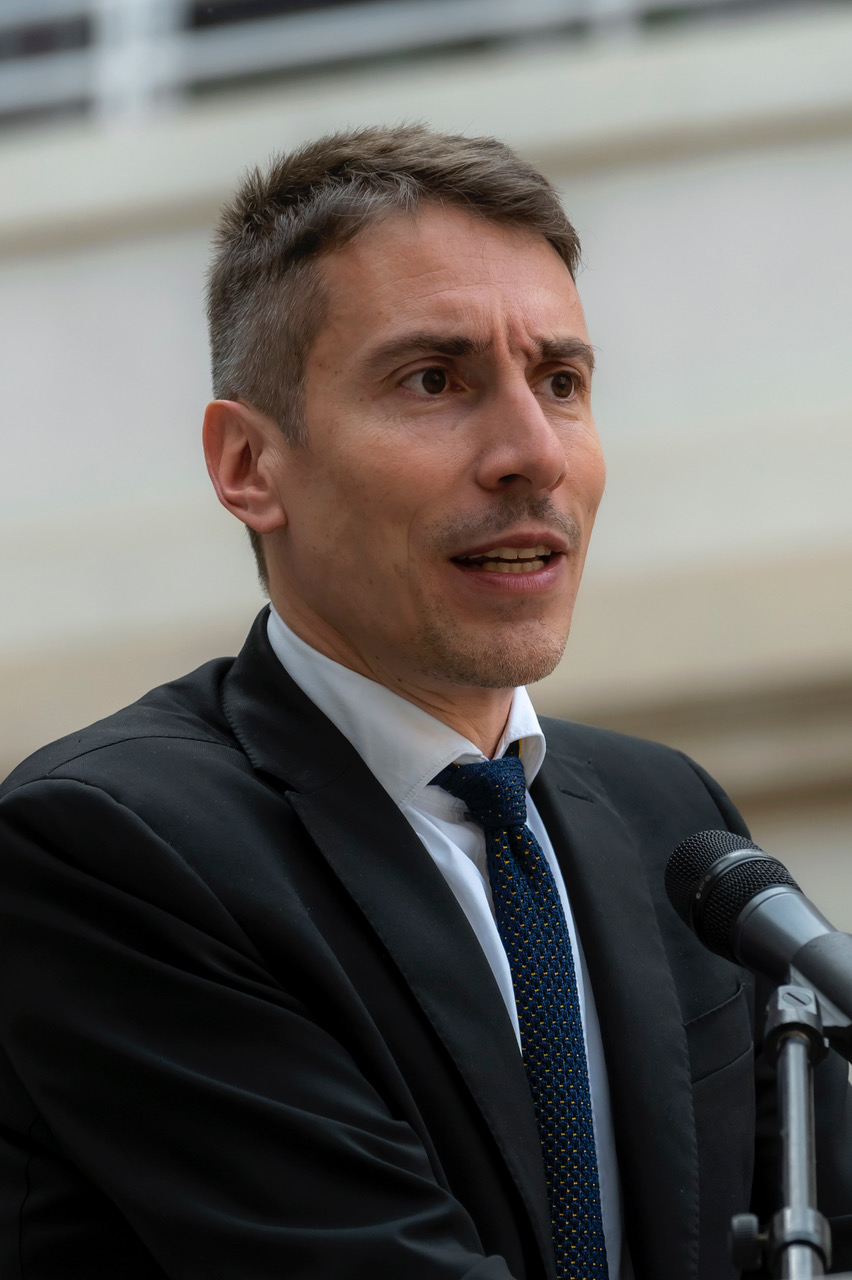
Greco at the 2022 Passepartout Festival in Asti

Christian Greco (born 15 April 1975) is an Italian Egyptologist. Since 2014, he has been the director of Museo Egizio in Turin.

== Biography ==
Born in Arzignano, near Vicenza, to a family of Sicilian origins, Christian Greco graduated in 1994 with top marks at Liceo ginnasio Antonio Pigafetta. Admitted to Collegio Ghislieri of Pavia, he graduated in 1999 in Classics with a thesis on the archaeology of the ancient Near East at Università degli Studi di Pavia and, subsequently, in Egyptology at Leiden University in the Netherlands. He obtained his PhD in Egyptology from Università di Pisa in 2008.

Greco taught Latin and Greek at high school in Leiden and Haarlem from 2003 to 2008 and was epigraphist at the Epigraphic Survey of the Oriental Institute of the University of Chicago in Luxor from 2006 to 2010. From 2009 to 2014, he was curator of the Egyptian section of the Rijksmuseum van Oudheden of Leiden.

In 2014, he became Director of Museo Egizio, Turin, after an international recruitment managed by Fondazione Museo delle Antichità Egizie led by Evelina Christillin, the president since 2012.

== Projects and scientific activities ==
Greco has organised several national and international exhibitions for the Rijksmuseum van Oudheden.

At Museo Egizio, Greco led the 2015 re-display of the exhibition. Subsequently, he promoted the implementation of a number of temporary exhibitions: "Il Nilo a Pompei" (2016), “Missione Egitto 1903 – 1920. L'avventura archeologica M.A.I. raccontata” (2017), "Anche le statue muoiono. Conflitto e patrimonio tra antico e contemporaneo" (2018), "Archeologia Invisibile" (2019), "Aida, figlia di due mondi" (2022). At the same time, he continued to implement development and evolution of the permanent galleries, among them the Historical Gallery (2019) and the Hall of Life (2021), promoting the concept of a continuously evolving museum, able to share with its different publics the progressive results of the research that is carried out on the objects of its collection.

Within the Museum, Greco coordinated several research projects. Since 2018 he has led the Turin unit of the transnational project "Crossing Boundaries – Understanding Complex Scribal Practices in Ancient Egypt", in collaboration with Basel University and Liège University.

From 2018 to 2022 he led the consortium of European museums consisting of Museo Egizio (heading institution), British Museum, Louvre Museum, Ägyptisches Museum und Papyrussammlung and Rijksmuseum van Oudheden, involved in "Transforming the Egyptian Museum of Cairo", supported by the European Union. Greco regularly collaborates as a visiting professor with various Italian and foreign universities, among which Università degli Studi di Torino, Università degli Studi di Pisa, IUSS di Pavia, Università Cattolica del Sacro Cuore, Scuola IMT Alti Studi di Lucca and NYUAD.

Greco was member of the archaeological mission of the Rijksmuseum van Oudheden to Tell Sabi Abyad in 1997–1998, of the mission of Pisa University to Dra Abu el-Naga in 2005–2006, of the mission of Leiden University and of the National Museum of Antiquities at Saqqara in 2002, of the mission of Università Cà Foscari (Venezia) to Gebel Barkal in Sudan in 2013. Since 2015, he has been co-director of the joint Dutch-Italian mission to Saqqara investigating a group of New Kingdom tombs, including that of Horemheb. In 2023 the archeological mission announced the discovery of the tomb of Panehsy, 'chief servitor' the temple of the god Amun.

== Appointments ==
Greco has been the current president of the scientific committee of Collegio Ghislieri of Pavia since 2014 and has been a member of the board of directors of the MANN of Naples since 2015.

Since 2018, he has been a member of the scientific committee of the Grand Egyptian Museum, of the scientific committee of Fondazione Scuola dei Beni e delle Attività Culturali of Rome and of the faculty of the PhD programme in “Archeologia e culture del Mediterraneo antico. Ricerca storica, conservazione, fruizione del patrimonio” of the Scuola Superiore Meridionale di Napoli, at the Università degli Studi di Napoli Federico II.

From 2014 to 2018, he was a member of the technical-scientific committee for the archaeological heritage of the Italian Ministry MIBACT, and from 2015 to 2018, he was a member of the board of directors of the University of Pavia.

== Scientific publications and dissemination ==
Greco is the author of several scientific and popular publications, including Christillin E. and Greco C., Le memorie del futuro. Musei e ricerca, Turin: Einaudi, 2021 and Greco C. Tutankhamun, la scoperta del giovane faraone, Novara: De Agostini, 2022. The complete and updated list of publications is maintained on his personal page ORCID and on his Google Scholar profile.

Since his arrival in Turin as Director, Greco introduced the Passeggiate del Direttore (Director's Walks), during which he personally leads small groups of visitors along the halls of Museo Egizio. In 2020, during the first COVID-19 lockdown, he filmed over seven hours of videos in the museum's galleries, which were released weekly on the museum's social networks as a series of 25 passeggiate virtuali, which achieved hundreds of thousands of visualisations.

== Prizes and awards ==
Grecco was awarded the title of 'Accademico' of the Accademia Olimpica of Vicenza since 2019. He was nominated 2019 Best Museum Director by Artribune, and again in 2022, on artribune.com and received several prizes, including the Premio Ghislieri 2014, the Premio Camerina 2016, the prize Ragusani nel Mondo 2017, Masi per la Civiltà Veneta and Inquietus nel 2018, and the Premio Letterario Beato Contardo Ferrini 2020.

In July 2021, Greco was an invited speaker at the opening ceremony of the G20 Culture Ministers' Meeting held at the Colosseum in Rome.

He was awarded the Ordine al Merito della Repubblica Italiana in July 2021.

== Works ==
- Alla ricerca di Tutankhamun, Franco Cosimo Panini, 2023 (presented at Villa Bertelli, Forte dei Marmi)

Preceded by Eleni Vassilika	Director of the Museo Egizio; 28 April 2014 – in charge	Succeeded by
