= The Gardeners of America/Men's Garden Clubs of America =

The Gardeners of America Men's Garden Clubs of America

- 31 Member Clubs in 14 States (2018)
- Abbreviation: TGOA/MGCA
- Formation: September 26, 1932
- Legal status: 501(c)(3) Nonprofit
- Purpose: Gardening education and community beautification.
- Headquarters: P.O. Box 241; 5560 Merle Hay Road; Johnston, IA 50131-0241; 515-278-0295
- Members: Men and women with an interest in gardening and horticulture.
- President: Carl Christensen
- Main organ: A national board of directors.
- Affiliations: American Horticultural Soc.
- Remarks: Also known as TGOA, MGCA, TGOA/MGCA, The Gardeners of America, and Men's Garden Clubs of America.

The Gardeners of America/Men's Garden Clubs of America (TGOA/MGCA) is a national organization with 31 affiliated garden clubs located in 14 states (2018) across the United States. The organization is also known as Gardeners of America (TGOA) or Men's Garden Clubs of America (MGCA). It has its headquarters in Johnston, Iowa, a business suburb of Des Moines. It is a non-profit organization incorporated in the state of Illinois, and registered with the IRS as a 501(c)(3) non-profit group. Most clubs include men and women members, and concentrate on gardening education (for members and nonmembers), and community beautification and enhancement. At one time the organization had about 10,000 members.

== History ==
The Men's Garden Clubs of America organization was founded in 1932, and grew rapidly as a unique organization of male gardeners. By 1993 the organization had grown greatly, and the bylaws were changed. The organization became The Gardeners of America with two divisions: The Gardeners of America and Men's Garden Clubs of America. (Note: More on organization history.) While local clubs may feel more closely affiliated with one division, all are members of TGOA/MGCA. Today many clubs include both men and women, although some all-male clubs still exist.

== Objective ==
The mission statement of TGOA/MGCA as stated on the organization website is

The mission of TGOA/MGCA is to promote gardening education and related environmental issues to its membership and the gardening public through charitable, educational and scientific means. (Note: The mission statement and list of organization objectives.)

It works towards this objective by providing activities that help member clubs develop and publicize new or improved gardening techniques. People living in a location without local garden clubs can become a member-at-large (Note: Member-at-large membership.) and participate in TGOA/MGCA programs. (Note: A list of national programs.) TGOA/MGCA operates in partnership with the American Horticultural Society, and optional membership in AHS includes the publication The American Gardener, which cites TGOA/MGCA activities.

TGOA/MGCA is listed as a gardening resource on various websites.

== National programs ==
In addition to the programs and projects of local garden clubs, TGOA/MGCA sponsors the following national programs.

- Gardening From The Heart (Note: The Gardening From The Heart program.) provides community services for projects that benefit disadvantaged and aging gardeners.
- Big Pumpkin, Giant Sunflower, and Container Garden Contests encourages kids to grow plants.
- Youth Gardening provides national funding for gardening projects that engage youth.
- Scholarships (Note: The Scholarship program.) of $1,000 are awarded annually to horticulture students based on local club applications.
- Photography Contest (Note: The Photography Contest program.) rewards members by publishing their photographs in the Gardener's Calendar, and by displaying them on the Internet. They are shown during presentations at each year's national convention. (Note: Past winning plant and landscape photographs.)
- Gardener's Calendar is published annually using photographs from the Photography Contest. Many clubs use the calendar for fundraising, or present it as a speaker gift or other award.
- Website www.TGOA-MGCA.org provides up-to-date information for members and officers. Although there is a members-only section of the website, much useful information about gardening and club activities is available to the general public as part of the organization's education mission. For example, Gardening and Horticulture Publications is a wide-ranging collection of articles that are posted online, and available to anyone. (Note: Club gardening and horticulture publications.)

Botanist Liberty Hyde Bailey was awarded the first Johnny Appleseed Memorial Medal by Men's Garden Clubs of America in 1948.

== Local clubs ==
Affiliated clubs are located across the United States, with most located in mid-America. Specific details about each club (such as club name, location, and contact information) are available at the TGOA/MGCA website. (Note: Information about each local club.) Many garden club websites specifically cite their club's current or past affiliation with TGOA/MGCA.

Sometimes affiliation with TGOA/MGCA leads to the formation of a more narrowly focused garden club, as is the case with the Corvallis Rose Society.

=== Accomplishments ===
Club members engage in a wide range of activities. (Note: Specific activities at local clubs.) The table that follows shows conservative estimates of total annual contributions made by all TGOA/MGCA clubs to their communities. This information is based on a 2007 survey where 45% of member clubs responded.

Club Activity	Per Year
Garden Spots Maintained	1,000
Youth Served	1,600
Trees Planted	500
Shrubs and Flowers Planted	85,000
Trees and Shrubs Sold	3,400
Flowers Sold	160,000
Horticultural Surveys of Homes and Businesses	300
Miles of Litter Picked Up	40
People Involved With Horticultural Tours	2,800
Contributions to Student Scholarships	$34,000
Other Club Contributions	$33,000

== Meetings and conventions ==
There are several occasions when members gather into groups on a regular basis: local club meetings, regional meetings, national planning and business meetings, and national conventions.

=== Local meetings ===
Arrangements for local club meetings vary based on the needs of individual clubs and their communities, but they generally are held monthly, and include an educational program on gardening techniques, community enhancement, or other topics. They also review current and future club projects and present awards to club members, Time is included for sharing gardening or project problems and solutions, and socializing.

=== Regional meetings ===
The 36 clubs in 14 states are grouped into 11 geographic regions (2016), as shown in the following table. If a state has more than one club, then that number is shown in parentheses after the state name. Missouri has clubs in two regions.

Region Name	States (Clubs)
1. Central Great Lakes Gardeners	Indiana; Michigan; Ohio (9)
2. Florida-Georgia	Georgia
3. Illinois-Wisconsin	Illinois (4); Wisconsin
4. Mid-America	Iowa (3)
5. Mid-South	Mississippi
6. Missouri-Kansas	Kansas (2); Missouri (1)
7. Northwest	Washington
8. Ozark	Missouri
9. Rocky Mountain	Colorado
10. Southwest	Texas (4)
11. Upstate New York	New York (5)

Each region is formally chartered by the national organization, adopts its own bylaws using the TGOA/MGCA bylaws as a guide, and assists in carrying out national programs. Each club elects a National Director to the TGOA/MGCA board, to represent the club at board and region meetings and to provide direct club communications with the National office and officers.

Other activities that take place by region include gardening workshops and seminars, tours of local gardens, business meetings, annual regional conferences, and the presentation of region awards to club members.

=== Board meetings ===
The board of directors meets at each national convention, and also holds an annual meeting in November of each year.

=== National conventions ===
TGOA/MGCA holds annual national conventions that are hosted by local clubs in cities across the United States. The purpose of each convention is to learn from other gardeners, tour local gardens and horticultural sites, participate in educational workshops and seminars, share information on service projects and fundraisers, present national awards to club members, and conduct a business meeting of the organization.

== Notes ==
All links are to pages on the TGOA/MGCA website that contain information not presented in this article.
