= Juan Carlos Curto =

Juan Carlos Curto is an Argentine judge. He has investigated the 2013 Rosario gas explosion, until he recused himself from the trial.
