= National Garden Clubs =

American nonprofit organization

- National Garden Clubs, Inc.
- Abbreviation: NGC
- Formation: 1929
- Type: 501(c)(3)
- Purpose: Promote gardening, floral design, and environmental responsibility
- Headquarters: St. Louis, Missouri
- Region served: United States
- Members: 190,000 (2023)
- President: Brenda Moore
- Website: gardenclub.org

National Garden Clubs, Inc. is a nonprofit 501(c)(3) organization headquartered in St. Louis, Missouri. It consists of dozens of local branches, in nearly every state in the US and has about 190,000 members as of 2021. Its stated mission is "to promote the love of gardening, floral design, and civic and environmental responsibility." The first local branch met in Athens, Georgia, in 1891, and the National Garden Clubs organization was formed in 1929, by which point there were branches in 19 states. The NGC organizes community gardening projects, provides educational programs, and produces a quarterly publication, the National Gardener. It also offers college scholarships and grants for youth clubs planting pollinator gardens. They have published The Handbook for Flower Shows and Designing By Type. Brenda Moore, of West Virginia, was installed as the president of the organization in 2023.

== Partnerships ==
National Garden Clubs works with the USDA Forest Service through the Penny Pine program to plant trees in areas where they have been destroyed.

== Blue Star markers ==
It installs plaques on highways and public gardens honoring the U.S. military.
