= Blue Star Memorial Highway =

U.S. highway designation

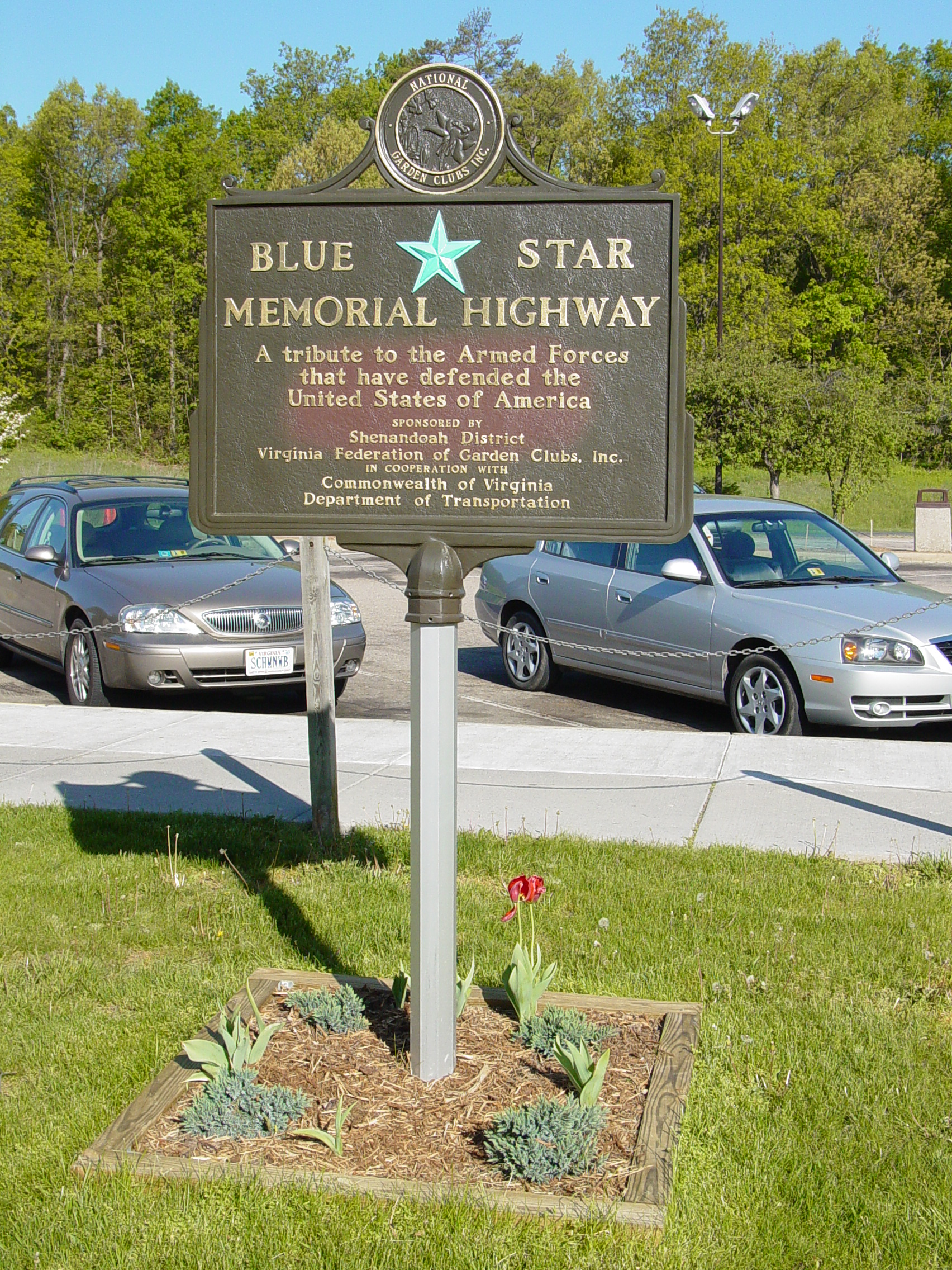
Blue Star Memorial Highway marker on Interstate 81 northbound near New Market, Virginia

Blue Star Memorial Highways are highways in the United States that are marked to pay tribute to the U.S. armed forces. The National Council of State Garden Clubs, now known as National Garden Clubs, Inc., started the program in 1945 after World War II. The blue star was used on service flags to denote a service member fighting in the war. The program has since been expanded to include Memorial Markers and Memorial By-ways (since 1994). These markers are used in National Cemeteries, parks, veterans facilities, and gardens.

== List ==
=== Alabama ===
- Scenic Highway 98, Baldwin County starting at Montrose–Daphne city line and traveling north through Montrose
  - Sponsored by the Montrose Garden Club
  - Dedicated April 18, 2015, in a ceremony held at Knights of Columbus Hall
- US 31 just north of Prattville

=== Alaska ===
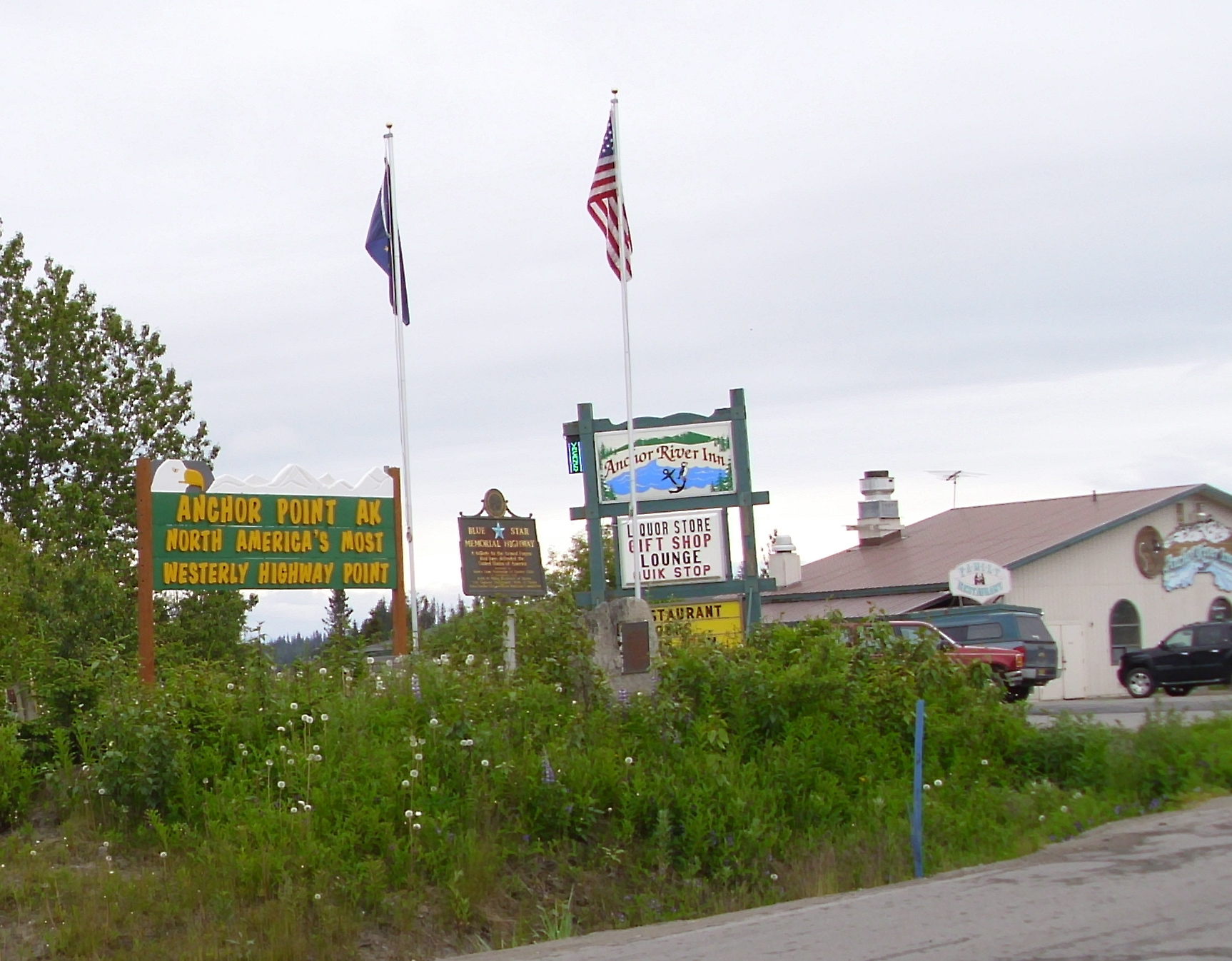
Marker in Anchor Point, Alaska

Glenn Highway in Anchorage between Medfra and Karluk in a planter box in the triangular median where the highway splits into Fifth and Sixth Avenues.

- Sterling Highway, marker at Anchor Point, the westernmost point on the North American contiguous highway system.

=== Arkansas ===
- I-30; Marker is at the Arkansas Welcome Center on East-bound I-30 just outside of Texarkana.
- There also is a marker at Arkansas State University in Jonesboro Ar,
- Interstate 55 at the Arkansas Welcome Center in Blytheville AR. Mile marker 68 southbound.

=== California ===
- SR 58 in Southern California
- SR 211, in Humboldt County; marker at Veterans Memorial Building, 1100 Main Street, Ferndale
- US 101 at Trinidad in Humboldt County; markers at both north and south bound Trinidad rest areas between miles 728 and 731
- SR 62 in Southern California from the Arizona state line to I-10
- Interstate 80 at Hunter Hill Safety Rest Area in Vallejo, California
- U.S. 395 at Coso Junction in Inyo County
- San Fernando Blvd. (Former U.S. Route 99) in Burbank, California; marker located at McCambridge Park

=== Colorado ===
- US 40 in Lakewood
- US 287 in Lafayette at Baseline Road.

=== Delaware ===
- US 13 at the Smyrna Rest Area and in Seaford.

=== Florida ===
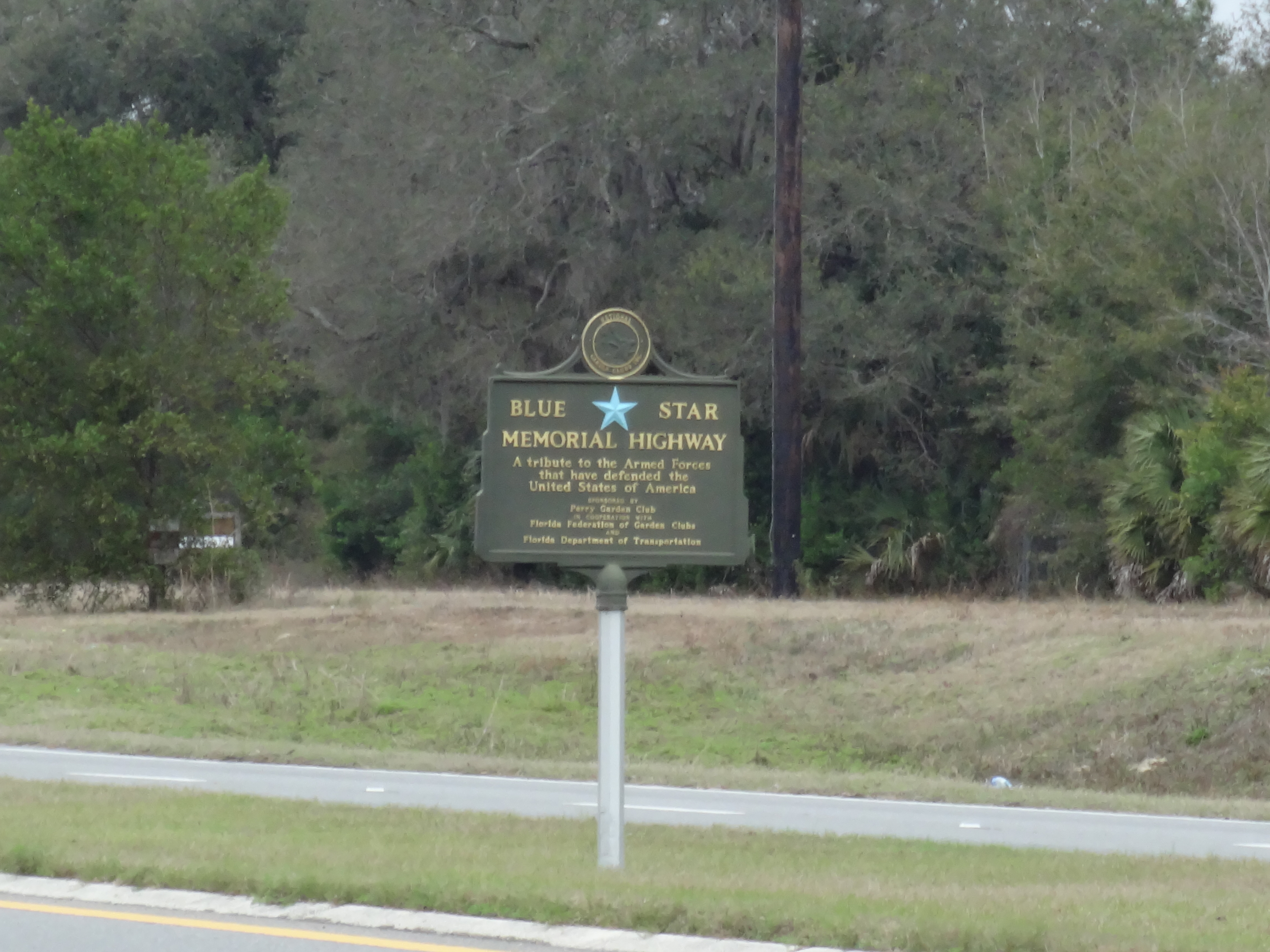
Perry, Florida

- US 1 in Florida
- US 17 in Charlotte County, Citrus County, Clay County
- US 19 and US 27 in Perry, Florida
- US 41 in Charlotte County, Collier County, Lee County, Manatee County, Sarasota County
- US 90 in Baker County
- US 92 at the intersection with CR 579 on Kennedy Hill in front of the Hardee's Restaurant between the towns of Thonotosassa, Seffner, and Mango.
- US 92 at the intersection with the Lake Parker boat ramp at Sertoma Park in Lakeland.
- US 98 and Gautier Road in Constitution Park, Port Saint Joe
- US 98 in Bay County
- US 441 in Alachua County
- Lakewood Ranch Town Hall in Lakewood Ranch
- Old Route 41 in Bonita Springs

=== Georgia ===
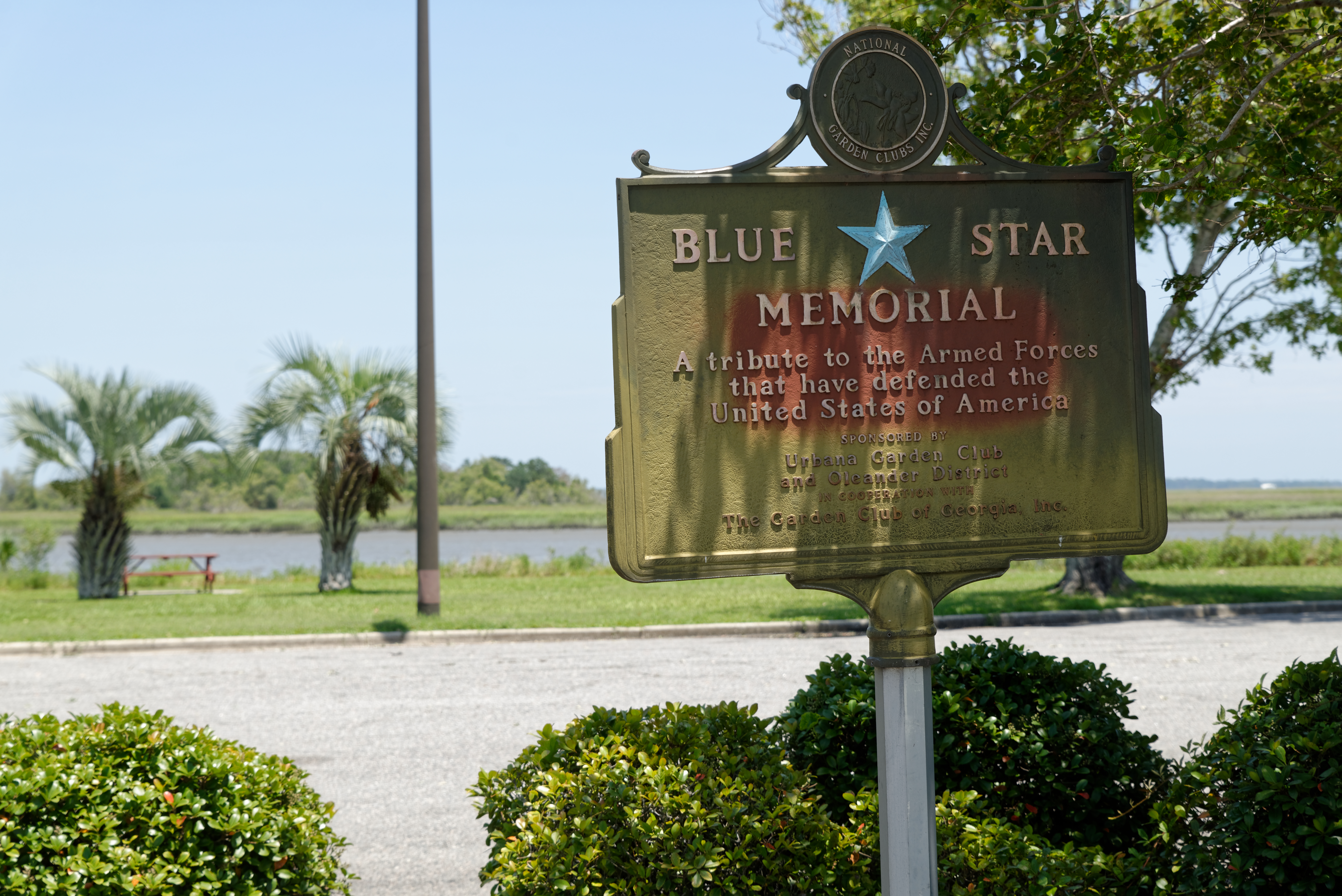
Brunswick, Georgia

- I-75 at the Georgia Welcome center near Ringgold.
- I-75 at the Georgia Welcome center in Lowndes County.
- I-75 at the Georgia Rest area in Cook County.
- I-75 at the Georgia Rest area in Dooly County.
- I-75 at the Georgia Rest area in Monroe County.
- I-75 at the Georgia Rest area in Turner County.
- I-95 at the Georgia Welcome center near Savannah.
- SR 13 (Buford Highway) between Rest Haven and Buford
- SR 13 (Buford Highway), Cornelia
- Lumpkin Street near the University of Georgia, Athens
- Covington (Hwy 36) Monticello Street SW at Church Street
- In front of the Thomas County Courthouse, Thomasville
- Along GA27/US341 in front of the Appling County Public Library, Baxley, Appling County
- Along GA37 in Fort Gaines, Clay County
- Along GA35/GA133 in Moultrie, Colquitt County
- In Riverfront Park, Albany, Dougherty County
- In Marshes of Glynn Overlook Park, off US 17, Brunswich, Glynn County
- Along US19 in roadside park, Mitchell County
- Along GA18/US41 in front of the American Legion buildings in Forsyth, Monroe County
- Along GA153 in Ellaville, Schley County
- Along GA38/US84 in front of the Screven City Hall, Screven
- Along GA3/GA30/US19 in Americus, Sumter County
- Along US1 in roadside park, Toombs County
- Along GA4/US1/US23 in Ware County
- Along US341 in Jesup, Wayne County
- In Georgia Veterans State Park, Crisp County

=== Illinois ===
- IL 43 (South Harlem Avenue) at the intersection of Will County Route 74 (West Laraway Road) in Frankfort in 1980.
- 95th Street & Cook Avenue in Oak Lawn; Across from Oak Lawn Village Library.
- 95th Street & Spaulding Avenue in Evergreen Park.
- Illinois Route 43 (North Harlem Avenue) at the intersection on North Avondale Avenue (approx. 6300 North)
- East Lake Ave., Glenview Blue Star Memorial Highway and Woods.

=== Indiana ===
- US 31 Business in Peru at the southwest Intersection with River Road.
- I-70 eastbound and westbound rest area's near Plainfield.
- US 50 in Jackson County, on the northwest area of Muscatatuck National Wildlife Refuge.

February 21, 1950	Terre Haute	H1
February 21, 1950	Centerville	H1
December 11, 1950	G.C. of Indiana	H3
August 12, 1953	Indiana State G.C.	?
May 3, 1971	Indiana G.C.	H2
January 7, 1974	Garden Clubs of Indiana	H1
June 7, 1978	Garden Clubs of Indiana	H2
July 16, 1979	G.C. of Indiana, Inc.	H1
July 16, 1979	G.C. of Indiana, Inc. – Southeast District	H1
September 28, 1979	G.C. of Indiana, Inc. – Northwest District	H1
May 12, 1980	G.C. of Indiana, Inc. – Central District	H1
December 18, 1982	G.C. of Indiana, Inc. – Southwest District	H2
April 18, 1985	New Castle G.C.	B1
April 18, 1985	Brown County G.C., Nashville, IN	B1
December 9, 1987	Hobart G.C., Hobart	B1
April 29, 1991	Southbend G.C., Southbend	H1
June 20, 1991	G.C. of Indiana, Inc., Pendleton	H1
April 3, 1992	G.C. of Indiana, Inc., Indianapolis	B1
May 31, 1996	Plainfield G.C., Danville	B1
February 13, 1997	Marengo G.C., Hardinsburg	B1
March 9, 1998	G.C. of Indiana, Inc., Indianapolis	B1
August 24, 1998	Dyer G.C., Dyer	B1
January 18, 1999	Dirt Diggers G.C., Paoli	B1
January 28, 1999	Flower Lane G.C., Columbus	B1
March 4, 1999	G.C. of Indiana, Inc., Hardinsburg	H1
March 22, 2000	G.C. of Indiana, Inc.	B1
January 8, 2001	Peru G.C.	B1
June 12, 2002	Come into the Garden	B1
May 19, 2003	Terrace G.C.	B1
July 21, 2004	Cultivating G.C.	H1
February 10, 2005	G.C. of Marion	H1
May 6, 2005	Central District of IN	H1
October 11, 2005	G.C. of Indiana, Inc., District II	B1
December 22, 2008	Vale of Paradise, Valpariso	H1
July 13, 2009	Portage G.C., Gilbert Park, Portage, IN	B1
January 10, 2012	Westwood G.C., VFW Post 1114, Evansville	B 1
April 30, 2012	G.C. of Indiana, S. Dan Jones Rd., Avon	H 1
June 22, 2013	Gibson County Fairgrounds, Princeton/Green Thumb Garden Club of Princeton, Inc.	M1
August 1, 2013	Lincoln State Park, Lincoln City/ Christmas Lake Village GC	B1
September 14, 2013	Black River Rest Area on I-64 near Griff, Princeton/ Green Thumb GC of Princeton, Inc.	H1
September 14, 2013	Gibson County Fairgrounds, Princeton/ Green Thumb GC of Princeton, Inc.	M1
June 1, 2014	Veterans Memorial Park, 303 W. Henry St., Syracuse/ Syracuse-Wawasee GC	B1
November 1, 2014	Eastside Park, Eastside Park Dr., Washington/ Washington Arts & Flowers GC	B1
November 9, 2014	Courthouse Square; Hwy 46-Greensburg/ Give un Take & Greensburg Nightbloomer GC's	H1
July 1, 2015	Hobart Historical Society, 706 E. 4th St., Hobart/ Hobart Garden Club	B1
March 2, 2016	200 W. Main St., Winamac IN/Iris-Elm GC	BBy-Way/1
April 11, 2016	Civic Center, 200 Block Main St., Sullivan IN/Sullivan County Garden Club IN	BBy-Way/1
April 20, 2016	9301 Madison-Crown Point, IN/North West District/ The Garden Club of Indiana, Inc.	BMemorial/1
April 19, 2016	1 Matter Park Circle, Marion IN/ The Garden Club of Marion IN	BBy-Way/1
June 16, 2016	Corner of Manor Ave. & Ridge Rd., Munster IN/ North West District; Munster Garden Club	BBy-Way/1
June 16, 2016	R.L. Roudebush VA Medical Center, 1481 W 10th St., Indianapolis IN/ The Garden Club of Indiana; Indiana's2016 Bicentennial	BMemorial/1
April 12, 2017	Wellfield Botanic Gardens, Elkhart IN/The Four Winds Garden Club	BBy-Way/1
July 23, 2017	Gateway Drive/HWY 50 East along sidewalk(east)/ Washington Arts & Flowers Garden Club	Bhighway/1
July 23, 2017	Crown Point Courthouse Square – Corner of Court & Joliet St – SW of Lake County Court House, Crown Point IN	BBy-Way/1
May 5, 2019	Clay Township Government Center, 10701 Twp. Gov. Center, Indianapolis IN 46280/Broad Ripple Garden Club	BHighway/1
Fall/2020	Boonville Courthouse, Courthouse Square, Boonville, IN/ Boonville GC, The Garden Club of Indiana, Inc	BBy-Way/1
May 31, 2021	Wolf Lake Memorial Park, 2324 Calumet Ave., Hammond, IN/ The GC of IN, Inc, NW District	GMemorial/1

- https://www.gardenclub.org/blue-and-gold-star-memorials

=== Iowa ===
- I-29 north of Council Bluffs; marker was originally placed along US 75 in 1955.

=== Kansas ===
Smith Center Garden Club National Garden Clubs Roadside Park

=== Kentucky ===
- Barkley Regional Airport, 2901 Fisher Road (West Paducah); Open Gate Garden Club, Paducah.

=== Louisiana ===
Date	Location	Sponsor
February 25, 1955	Fort Pike State Park Off Hwy 90, New Orleans	New Orleans Federated Council of Garden Clubs
November 14, 1972	Chef Menteur Hwy. (Hwy. 90) at Michoud Blvd., New Orleans	Les Belles Fleures Garden Club
December 2, 1972	Gen. DeGaulle Dr. In median at Mardi Gras Blvd.(West Bank)	Algiers, Aurora, and Buena Vista Garden Clubs
November 14, 1972	Gentilly Blvd. (Hwy. 90) In median at Gentilly Woods Shopping Center, New Orleans	Pontchartrain Garden Club
March 2, 1996	St. Bernard Hwy, (LA 46) Dela Ronde Home Ruins, Chalmette (lost in Katrina - August 2005)	Green Thumb Garden Club
March 2, 1996	St. Bernard Hwy. (LA 46) Arabi	Green Thumb Garden Club
Nov 1997	Judge Perez Dr. at Culture Center, Chalmette (lost in Katrina - August 2005)	Green Thumb Garden Club
April 26, 2002	City Park Botanical Gardens by the Flag Pole	Federated Council of New Orleans Garden Clubs
October 19, 2008	Hwy 23/Belle Chase Hwy Naval Air Station Joint Reserve Base (NAS/JRB)	District I & II
June 6, 2010	The National WWII Museum, 1001 Magazine St., New Orleans	"Freedom Isn't Free" Project, LGCF, Inc.
November 11, 2010	Hwy 23/Bell	Creative Planters Garden Club
April 11, 1961	International Airport, New Orleans. Original Lost; Replaced on August 22, 2011	Jefferson Parish Council of Garden Clubs, Inc.
1973	Jefferson Hwy LaBarre Rd. New Orleans	Jefferson Parish Council of Garden Clubs, Inc.
1973	Bridge City-West Bank (Hwy. 90) at foot of Huey P. Long Bridge	Jefferson Parish Council of Garden Clubs, Inc.
Nov.11 1996	Franklin Ave. at Stumpf Blvd. West Bank, Gretna	Twilight Gardeners Association, Gretna
September 11, 2002	Parterre Memorial Gardens in Lafreniere Park, Metairie	District II Garden Clubs
November 6, 2010	North End of Hwy 3134, (Intersect w/Barataria Blvd,) Marrero	Jefferson Parish Council of Garden Clubs
November 6, 2010	799 Jean Lafitte Blvd, Jean Lafitte	Better Swamps & Garden Club
April 6, 2011	Kenner Veteran's Park, 1901 Williams Blvd, Kenner	Chateux Estates Garden Club
May 6, 2011	Argonne St. & Transcontinental Ave., Metairie	Petals of North Bridgedale Garden Club
November 10, 2011	Veterans Memorial Blvd and North Causeway Blvd, Metairie	Jefferson Parish Council of Garden Clubs, Inc.
March 20, 2012	400 Block of Terry Parkway, Terrytown	Terrytown Garden Club
December 3, 1966	Hwy. 90 at Brashear Ave. In median with Eternal Flame	Morgan City Garden Club
March 11, 1967	Evangeline Thru-way at Tourist Information Center	Lafayette Garden Club
November 1966	Hwy. 90/182, New Orleans Blvd.	Terrebonne Garden Club
May 25, 1998	Hwy. 90 at South-East Blvd.	Bayou Vista Garden Club
April 24, 1999	LA1 at Nicholls State University, Thibodaux	Thibodaux Garden Club
November 11, 1999	Hwy. 90 at Hwy. 182, Entrance to City at Tourist Center	Patterson Garden Club
June 28, 2000	Hwy. 90/Service Rd., St. Mary Parish Tourist Center	Franklin Garden Club
November 11, 2000	LA Hwy. 96, Parish Building, 301 West Port St.	St. Martinville Garden Club
June 4, 2002	Jackson St. at West 10th St. Chaisson Park	Thibodaux Garden Club
May 27, 2002	1010 Main St. Sugar City Plaza, Jeanerette	New Iberia Garden Club
November 13, 2003	Convention & Visitors Bureau Hwy. 14, Iberia Parish	New Iberia Garden Club
November 10, 2004	Patterson City Hall, Hwy 182	Patterson Garden Club
July 4, 2004	Veterans Park - Berard St., Breaux Bridge	Breaux Bridge Garden Club
May 9, 2005	City Hall, Loreauville	Azalea Garden Club
May 29, 2005	City Hall Grounds on Main St.	Gueydan Garden Club
April 26, 2009	Hwy 182, 300 Patti Dr., Berwick Civic Center	Berwick Garden Club
	Welcome Center at 1-20, Shreveport West	Shreveport Federated Garden Clubs
November 11, 1978	Hwy 1 at entrance to LSU- Shreveport	Pierremont Hills Garden Club
	Hwy 71 South 8 miles from Arkansas State Line	Hosston Garden Study Club
April 7, 1974	Old Minden Rd. at Benton Rd.	Bossier City Garden Club
October 27, 2003	Turner's Pond by Lakeview United Methodist Church, Lake Shore Dr., Minden	Town & Country Garden Club
Unknown	Hwy 165, Bastrop	Bastrop Garden Club
June 1952	Roadside Park Hwy. 167 North	Ruston Garden Club
November 11, 1954	Hwy 15 & Loop Rd. Roadside Park	Winnsboro Garden Club
March 1, 1957	Hwy 15, Wisner	Wisner Garden Club
1987	Hwy 17, Epps	Epps Garden Club
1970's	Hwy 17 at Hwy. 80, Delhi	Delhi Garden Club
May 30, 1968	Hwy 165, West Monroe of the Twin Cities	Welcome Garden Club
May 30, 1968	Hwy 34 South, Monroe	Monroe Garden Club
November 11, 1994	LA Hwy 84, Tourist Center	Vidalia Garden Club
May 15, 2007	Hwy 84 at Bayou Cocodrie Welcome Sign	Ferriday Garden Club
November 6, 2007	Hwy 167 South, Jonesboro	Jonesboro Hodge Garden Club
May 15, 1956	Old Spanish Trail in median at Pontchartrain Dr. & Carey St.	Bayou Liberty Garden Club
1965	Hwy.61 at Florida Blvd./Airline (Cortana Mall) (destroyed)	Baton Rouge Garden Club
April 1963	Hwy I-55 Tourist Information Center, Hammond	Pine Cone Garden Club
November 1989	Cate Square Park	Hammond Garden Club
July 1, 2006	Independence Blvd.	Baton Rouge Garden Club
May 31, 2004	Hwy 16 at City Hall	Stem & Stamen Garden Club
July 4, 2007	Corner of Pine St. and the RailRoad	Ponchatoula Gardenetts and Community Garden Club
October 27, 2007	Hwy 36/21 St Tammany Fire District 12, Station 124	Covington Garden Club
November 11, 2007	Bayou Plaquemine Waterfront Park	Plaquemine Garden Club
November 11, 2008	Hwy Bus 61, 305 River Rd. S, In front of the USS Kidd	Baton Rouge Garden Club
November 11, 2008	Veterans Blvd between Florida Blvd and Range Ave	Denham Springs Garden Club
1960	Hwy 190 West at Tourist Information Center (Exit 19B from I-49)	Opelousas Garden Club
Nov.11 1964	Hwy 171 at Washington St.	DeRidder Gardenettes
Nov.11 1966	Hwy 27 at Roselawn Cemetery (Exit 20 from I-10)	Town & Country and Sulphur Garden Club
May 28, 1994	LA Hwy 103 (Exit 25 from I-49)	Washington Garden Club
November 11, 1998	LA Hwy 383 City Hall Complex, Iowa	Iowa Garden Club
November 11, 2000	LA Hwy 90 at Tourist Center, Lake Charles (remounted after Hurricane Rita - 2005) photo	Lake Charles and Diggers & Weeders Garden Club of Lake Charles
May 15, 2004	Hwy 90 at 250 West Laurel; Post Office, Eunice	Bulb and Blossom Garden Club
October 2, 2004	Hwy 165 - 4th St. at the Gazebo, Kinder	Spade & Hope Garden Club
November 10, 2006	City Hall, 126 E. Main St. Ville Platte	Magnolia Garden Club
May 26, 2007	SW Intersection of LA Hwy 13 and Interstate 10	Crowley Garden Club
Nov 1968	Hwy 167/71, MacArthur Dr. at Richard Avenue	Alexandria and Airview Terrace Garden Club
April 1, 1996	101 West Lee St., Leesville	Sponsored by the Alexandria Garden Club
October 25, 2000	LA Hwy 1- Clarence Edwards Park	Marksville Garden Club
December 7, 2009	Alexandria Air Force Base	Alexandria Garden Club
April 12, 2011	LGCF, Inc. Headquarters, 1606 Water St., Lecompte	LGCF, Inc. 75th Anniversary (1934 - 2009)

=== Maine ===
The history of Blue Star Memorial Highways in Maine, according to Maine Garden Clubs:

• 1946 — Garden Club Federation of Maine adopts program.

• 1947 — U.S. Route 1 designated as Maine's Blue Star Memorial Highway. This covered 546 miles from Fort Kent to Kittery.

• 1957 — U.S. Route 1 and U.S. 1-A, starting at the junction of Route 1A and 1 in Stockton Springs and extending via Bangor and Brewer to the junction of Route 1A and 1 in Ellsworth, are designated as Blue Star Memorial Highways.

• 1972 — U.S. Route 2, including Skowhegan, and state Route 3, are designated Blue Star Memorial Highways. This gave Maine 952 miles of Blue Star Memorial Highway.

• 1974 — State Route 157 and U.S. Route 201, from the junction of Route 1 at Brunswick to the Canadian border near Jackman, is designated a Blue Star Memorial Highway, giving Maine a total of 1171.6 miles of designated highway.

• 1981 — The new entrance to Maine Veterans Memorial Cemetery in Augusta is designated a Blue Star Memorial Highway.

=== Maryland ===
- U.S. Route 301 in all of Maryland

=== Massachusetts ===
- Interstate 495 and State Route 25, extending from I-95 close to the New Hampshire state line in Salisbury to Cape Cod. I-495 (Salisbury to Wareham portion) is the second-longest auxiliary Interstate Highway in the U.S.

=== Michigan ===
- U.S. Route 31
- Woodward Avenue, marker on northbound side, just south of I-696 in Pleasant Ridge
- U.S. 31/Blue Star Highway (County Road A2), north of Phoenix Road/Blue Star Highway traffic light in South Haven

=== Minnesota ===
- Interstate 35 throughout the state.
- Interstate 94 throughout the state.

=== Nebraska ===
- U.S. Route 83 Kansas border to South Dakota border

=== New Hampshire ===
- Interstate 95 throughout the state. There is a marker at the rest area in Seabrook just beyond the state line.

=== New Jersey ===
- U.S. Route 22 from Mountainside to North Plainfield
- County Route 632/Ridgedale Avenue from East Hanover, Morris County.
- North side of NJ 70 (John Davison Rockefeller Highway), just west of Chairville Road, Medford Township 08055
- Knowlton Rest Area, MM 7.2 Interstate 80 East Bound, Columbia, New Jersey 07832

=== New York ===
- Niagara Section of the New York State Thruway, Interstate 190, adjacent to the toll plaza for the northbound South Grand Island Bridge
- New Rochelle at intersection of Main Street and Pratt Street. Fanneuil Park across the street from the New Rochelle Armory.
- Brewster at the historic Brewster Metro-North station clock on the triangle at US 6 (Main Street) and Railroad Avenue.
- Rockland County, New York, Thruway Extension Section of the New York State Thruway to the Garden State Parkway at Chestnut Ridge, Installed and dedicated on October 22, 1958. The marker is currently missing (2018).
- Broome County, New York, the Southern Tier Welcome Center in Kirkwood along Interstate 81. Sponsored by National Garden Clubs Inc.

=== North Carolina ===
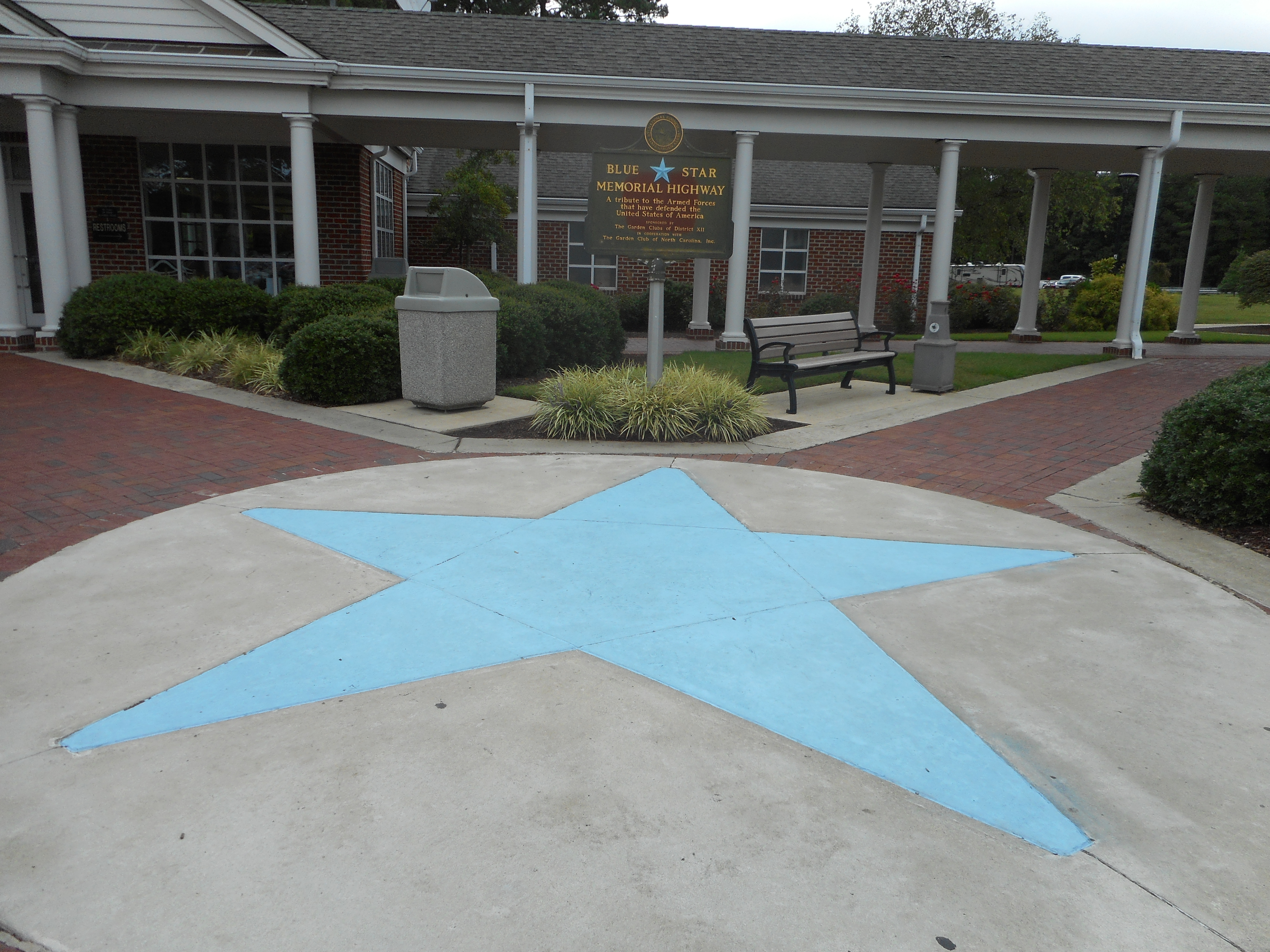
A paved blue star and historical marker at the southbound I-95 Welcome Center in Pleasant Hill, NC

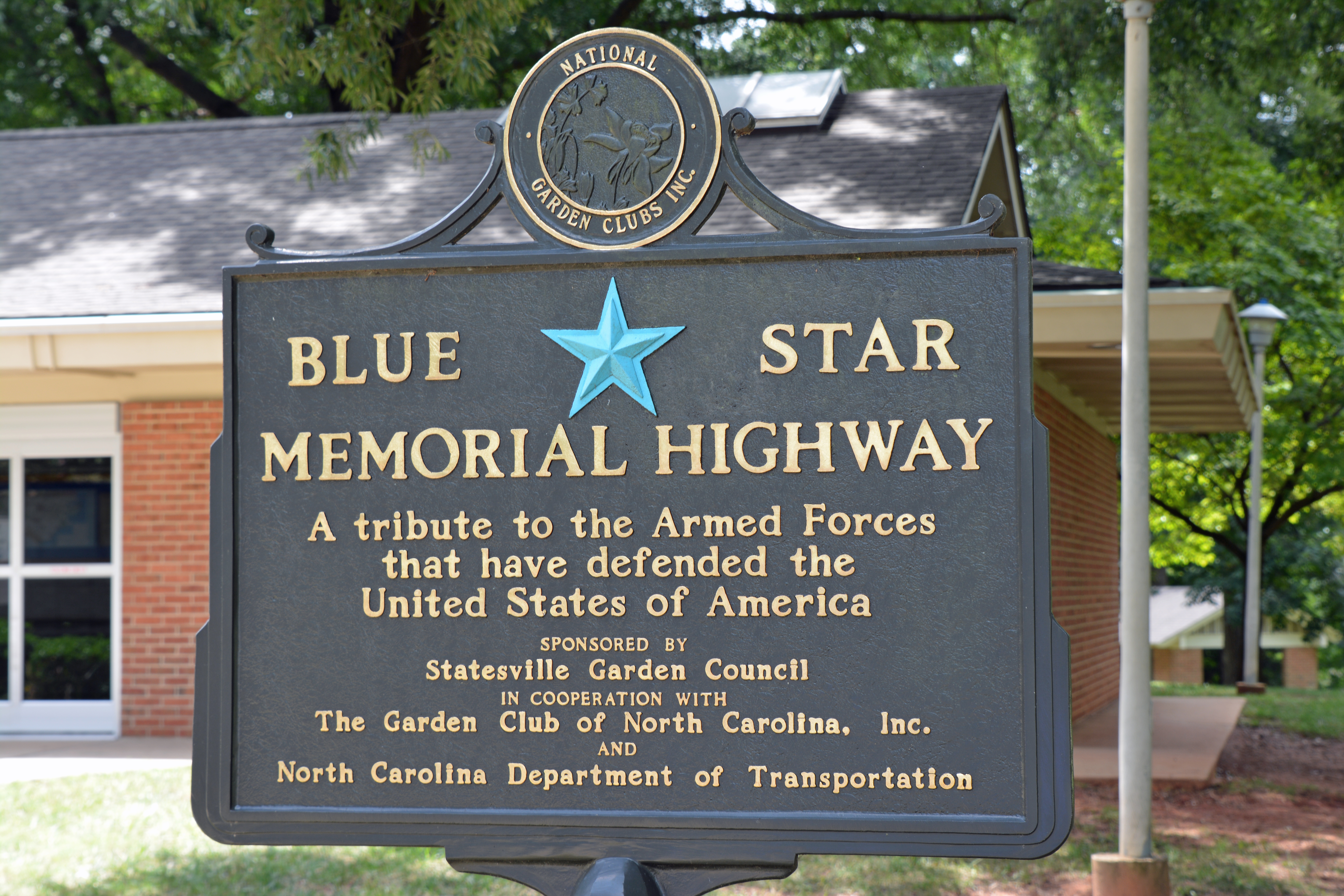
I-77 rest area, near Mooresville, NC

- Interstate 26, throughout state (approved on October 4, 1968).

Milepost 41 – Westbound Buncombe/Henderson County Rest Area (dedicated on July 18, 2008).
Milepost 68 – Westbound Welcome Center.

- Interstate 40, throughout state (approved on May 5, 1967).

Milepost 82 – Westbound McDowell County Rest Area.
Milepost 136 – Eastbound Catawba County Rest Area.
Milepost 364 – Duplin County Rest Area (dedicated on April 6, 2005).

- Interstate 77, throughout state.

Milepost 105 – Southbound Welcome Center (dedicated on July 21, 2006).

- Interstate 85, throughout state (approved on May 5, 1967).
- Interstate 95, throughout state (approved on June 13, 1980).

Milepost 181 – Southbound Welcome Center.

- U.S. Route 17, from Wilmington to Elizabeth City (approved on November 28, 1949).
- U.S. Route 64, from Tennessee state line to Nags head (approved in July 2017).
- U.S. Route 70, throughout state.

15th Avenue Place SE, in Hickory.

- U.S. Route 74 Business from Rockingham to Hamlet (approved on April 20, 1984).

New Hamlet Senior Center, in Hamlet (dedicated on October 18, 1984).

- U.S. Route 158, from Mocksville to Roanoke Rapids (approved on April 6, 1976).
- U.S. Route 158, from Roanoke Rapids to Elizabeth City (approved on May 4, 1972).
- U.S. Route 158, from Elizabeth City to Nags Head (approved on November 28, 1949).
- U.S. Route 301, throughout state (approved on April 28, 1949).

Hay Street at Freedom Memorial Park, in Fayetteville (dedicated on March 3, 1956).

- U.S. Route 421, in Wilkes County.

Milepost 282 – Northwest Visitor Center (dedicated on September 14, 2010).

- North Carolina Highway 24, in Jacksonville (approved on April 20, 1984).

Near City Hall towards Camp Lejeune, in Jacksonville (dedicated on May 27, 1984).

=== Oklahoma ===
- Blue Star Memorial By-Way, dedicated by the Dogwood Garden Club of Red Fork, Oklahoma to recognize military personnel for their service to the United States of America and the many service men and women have passed through Tulsa during their time in defending the country. Location: Route 66 Historical Village, 3770 Southwest Blvd, Tulsa, Oklahoma

=== Oregon ===
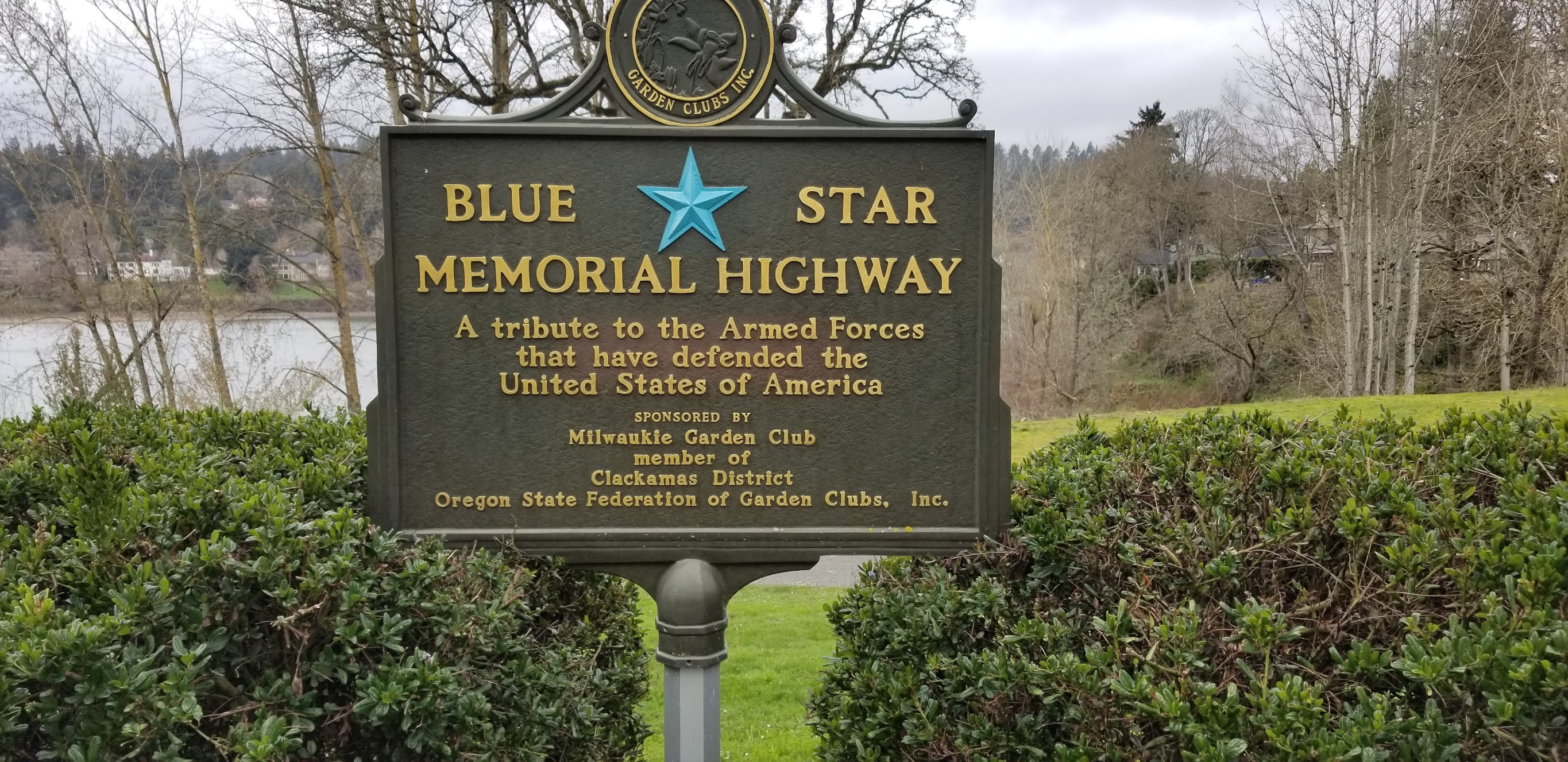
Milwaukie, Oregon

- Blue Star Memorial Rose Garden, Veterans Administration Healthcare System, Roseburg, Oregon. Location: Interstate 5, Garden Valley Blvd exit, west on Garden Valley. left(South) on Centennial Dr.-VA Roseburg entrance. Blue Star Memorial is located on the corner of Centennial Dr & NW Veterans Way.
- Washburne Wayside, Highway 99W, north of Junction City. Blue This marker is no longer here. The state sold the land and the marker was removed.
- Corvallis, Oregon on 99N, to the left of the entrance ramp on to road leading to I5
- Santiam Pass, Oregon Hwy 20 at Tombstone Wayside.
- Albany, Oregon, Waverly Park, Albany (28) Located right off I-5 and the entrance to Albany, Dedicated June 1, 1991.
- Alsea, Oregon, Alsea Memorial Garden (29) BWM Located in Alsea, close to OR Hwy 34, Dedicated June 21, 1991.
- Albany, Oregon, Linn County Veterans Memorial (63) Located in Albany's Timber Linn Park, off I-5, Dedicated May 17, 2008.
- Lebanon, Oregon, Edward C Allsworth Veteran's Home (81), Dedicated July 20, 2017
- Milwaukie, Oregon, Milwaukie Bay Park, On 99E
- Ontario, Oregon, Oregon Trail Rest Area on I-84 West exit 377

=== Pennsylvania ===
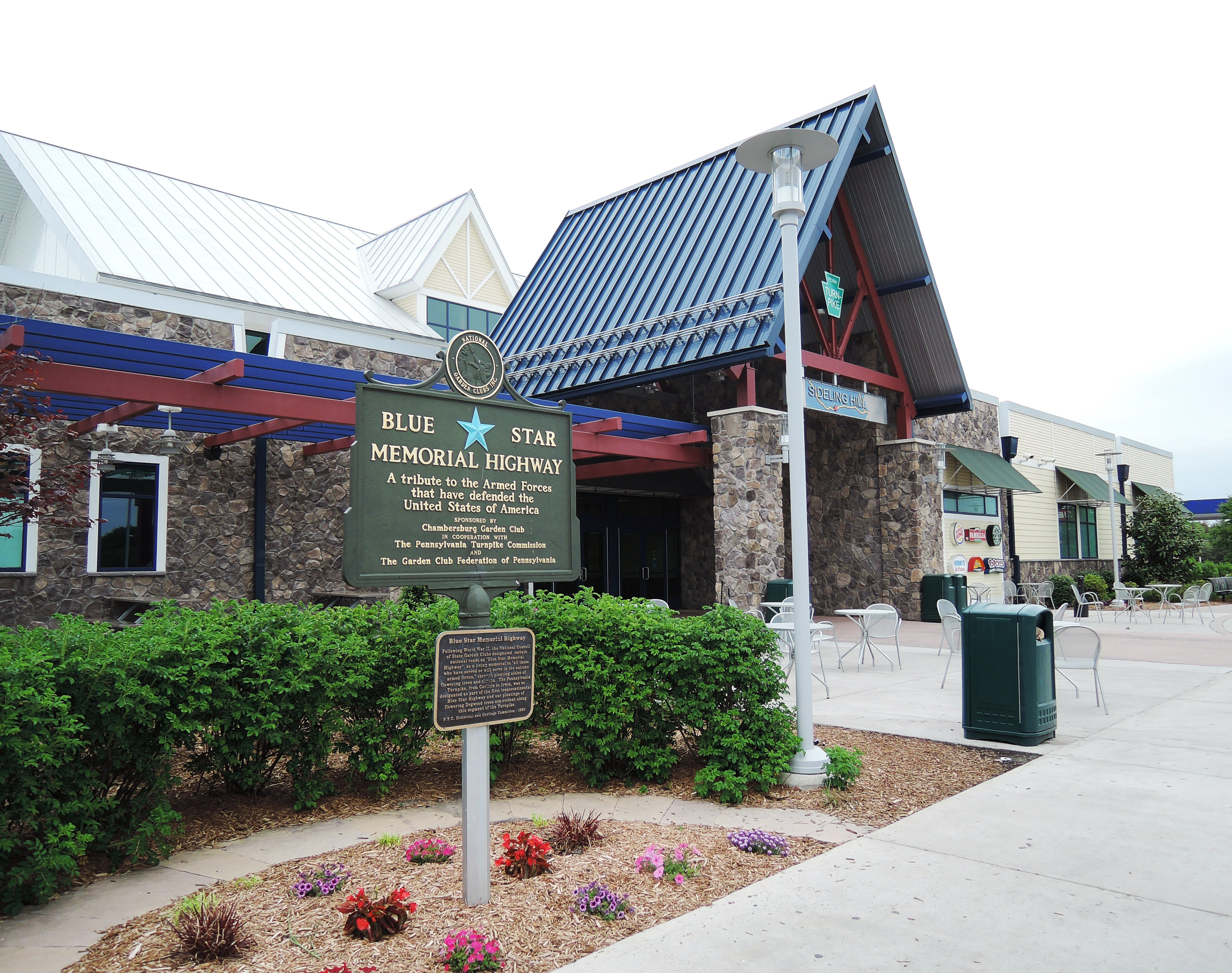
At the Sideling Hill rest area

- At most service areas along the Pennsylvania Turnpike, Interstate 76
- US 202 at Gulph Road in King of Prussia
- PA 252 at Providence Road in Media

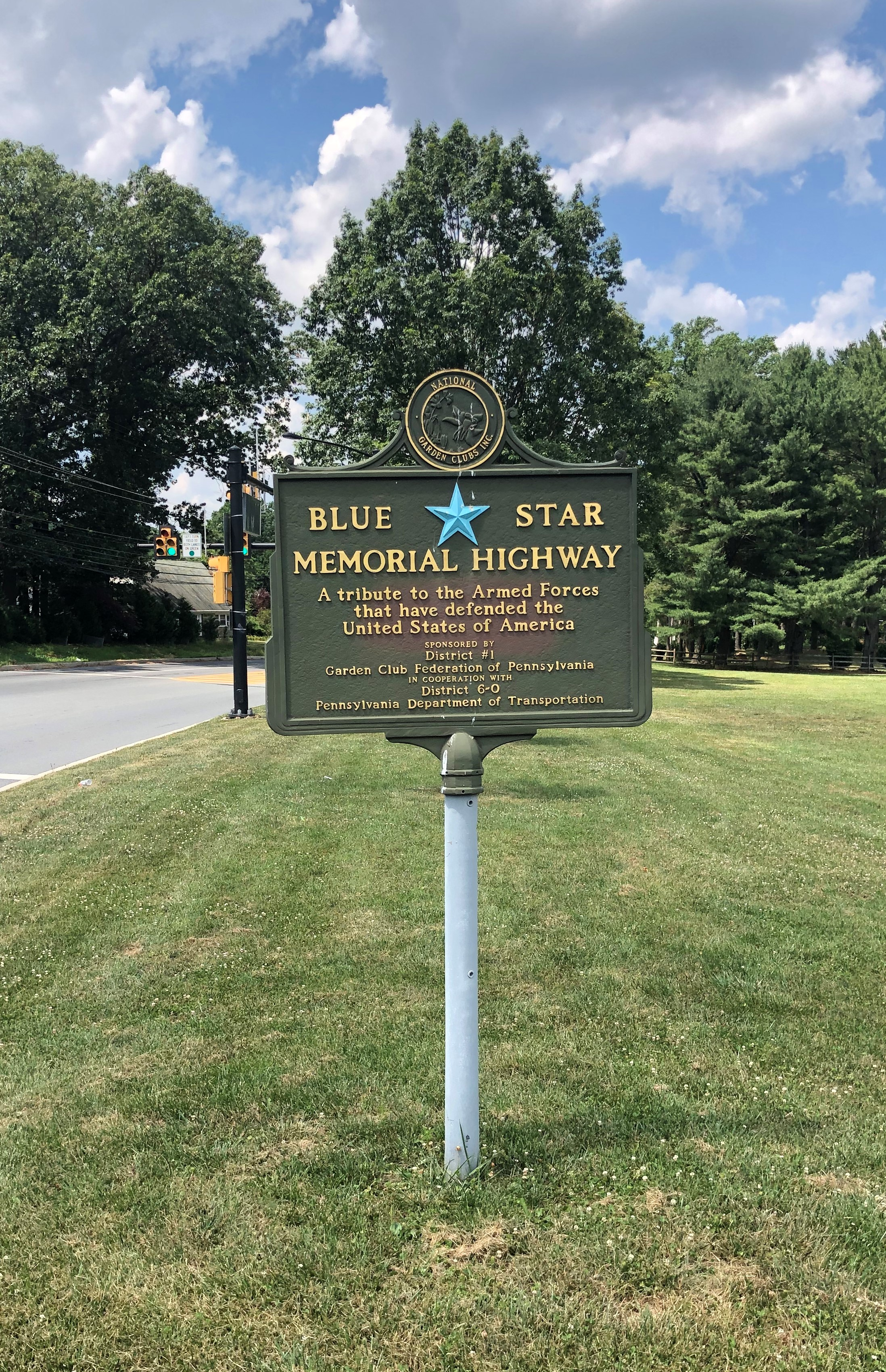
Blue Star Memorial Highway Marker - Media PA

=== Rhode Island ===
- Dedication held on August 10, 2013. Portsmouth Free Public Library, 2658 East Main Road, Portsmouth, Rhode Island

=== South Carolina ===
- Brushy Creek Rd in Greer at Century Park.
- Interstate 20, throughout state.

Milepost 0 – Eastbound Welcome Center.
Milepost 92 – Eastbound Kershaw County Rest Area.

- Interstate 77, throughout state.

Milepost 89 – Southbound Welcome Center.

- Interstate 85, throughout state.

Milepost 0 – Northbound Welcome Center.
Milepost 103 – Southbound Welcome Center.

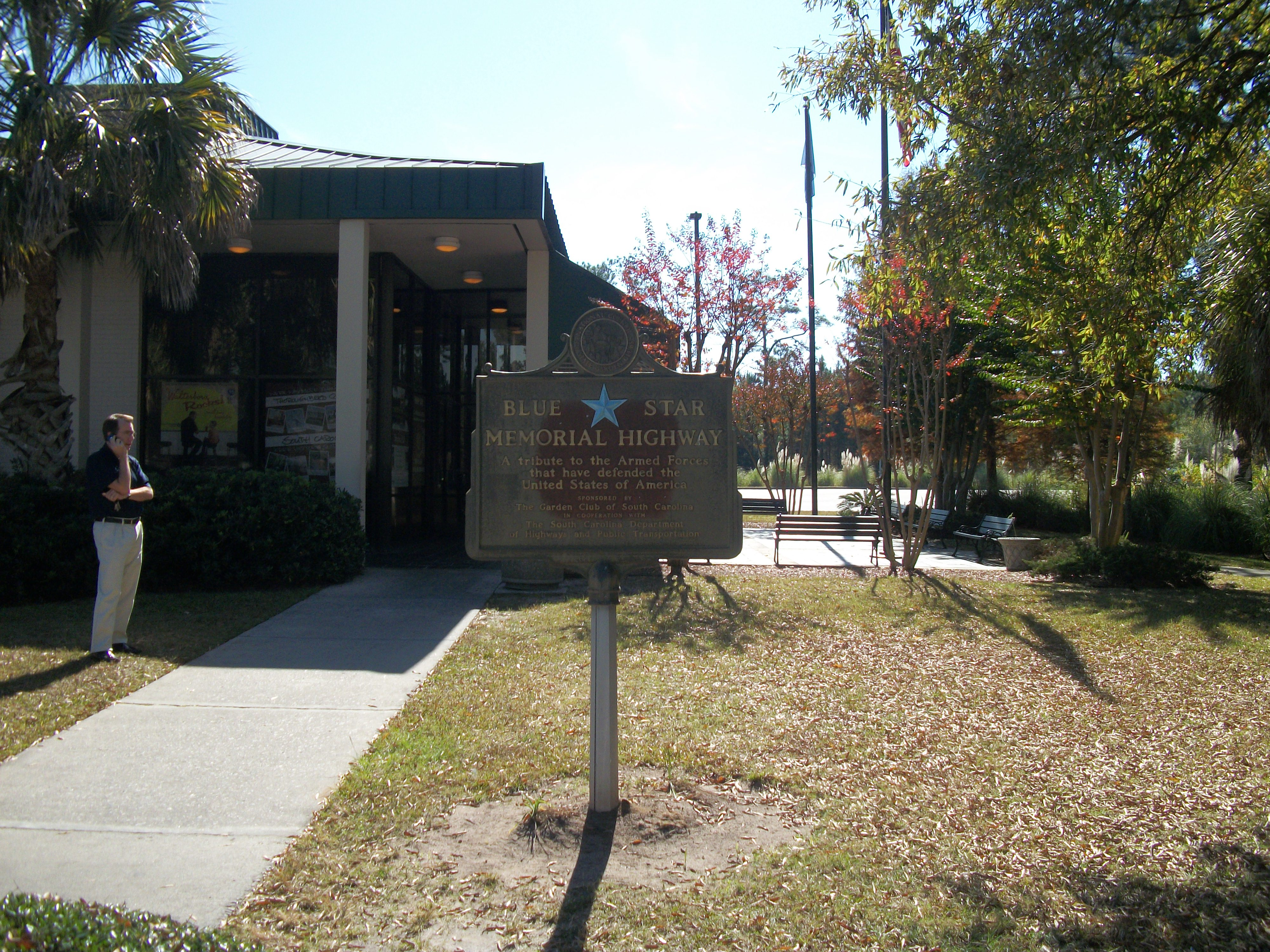
At the northbound I-95 South Carolina Welcome Center in Hardeeville, South Carolina.

- Interstate 95, throughout state.

Milepost 4 – Northbound Welcome Center.
Milepost 194 – Southbound Welcome Center.

- U.S. Route 1, throughout state.

At York Street and Richland Avenue intersection, in Aiken.
West end of the Gervais Street Bridge, in Columbia.
On South Carolina State Capital grounds, in Columbia.
Near Sesquicentennial State Park entrance, north of Columbia.
At Hampton Park, in Camden.
SC 151 intersection, in McBee (dedicated on April 14, 1953; rededicated on May 23, 2011); it was the sixth established blue star in the state.
Near North Carolina state line, in Marlboro County.

=== Tennessee ===
- U.S. Route 45 West in Gibson County, Tennessee
- U.S. Route 25 West in Cove Lake State Park in Campbell County, Tennessee
- U.S. Route 641 within Henry County, Tennessee

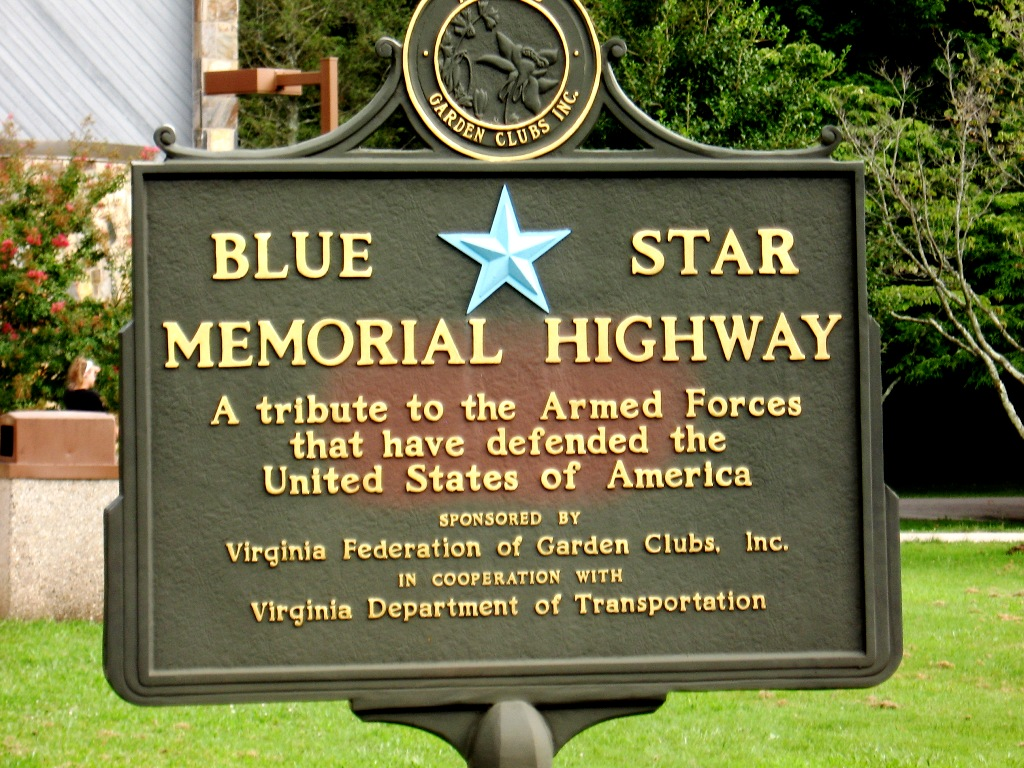
Virginia Blue Star Memorial Highway.

- U.S. Route 31W in Sumner and Robertson County (Until 1990s)

=== Texas ===
- Tarrant County - FM 1220 (Boat Club Road) just south of WJ Boaz Road
- U.S. 59 from Houston to Texarkana (designated 1976)
- FM 3188 from State 94 to its end at Camp Olympia in Trinity County (1983)
- U.S. 271 from Paris to Gladewater (1978)
- U.S. 287 from the Anderson-Houston county line to the Johnson-Ellis county line (1976).
- U.S. 385 from Big Bend National Park north to the Oklahoma state line north of Dalhart (1976).
- State 155 from Palestine to Linden (1975)
- U.S. 77 from the Oklahoma state line at Gainesville to Denton, then via other highways the New Mexico state line (1947 and 1953).
- SS 496 at Avondale from its junction with U.S. 287 southeasterly via Saginaw, Fort Worth and Kennedale to its junction with U.S. 287 in Mansfield (1988)

=== Virginia ===
- Interstate 77

Milepost 0 – Northbound Carroll County Rest Area (dedicated on May 30, 2005).

- Interstate 95

Milepost 0 – Northbound Greensville County Rest Area.

- U.S. Route 1 in Fairfax County
- Virginia State Route 3 in Lancaster County (effective on July 1, 2011).
- U.S. Route 301 from the Maryland State Line to Business U.S. Route 301 north of Bowling Green; thence via Business U.S. Route 301 to U.S. Route 301 south of Bowling Green and via Richmond, Colonial Heights, Petersburg and Emporia to the North Carolina State Line. (General Assembly February 24, 1948)
- U.S. Route 15 in Fluvanna County, on the campus of Fork Union Military Academy.
- U.S. Route 17 in the City of Chesapeake, running south from Route 64 down to the North Carolina border. The highway was dedicated on May 24, 2017.

=== Washington ===
- Old Pacific Highway, Vancouver, Washington. Oldest and newest (having been removed, restored and re-dedicated) Blue Star Memorial Highway Memorial Marker in state of Washington. Located at Covington House.
- Gateway Park, Interstate 90, Otis Orchards. Rest stop and park on the Washington side of the Idaho/Washington state line on Interstate 90. Sign located East of the buildings toward the car parking.
- Green Lake Park, N. 69th Street and Aurora Avenue North on the west side of highway in Seattle. Restored Blue Star Memorial Highway Memorial Marker.
- Veterans' Hospital on Beacon Hill, Seattle. New Blue Star Memorial Marker dedicated on August 5, 2016, at the garden main entrance to the hospital by the Greater Seattle and Chinook Districts of the Washington State Federation of Garden Clubs and affiliate of the National Garden Clubs, Inc.
- Gee Creek Rest Area, I-5 at Ridgefield, Washington by Washington State Federation of Garden Clubs
- Long Lake Garden Club in Port Orchard maintains a Blue Star marker at Retsil Veterans Home and Hospital in Port Orchard
- US 12 at Mossyrock Dam North recreational fishing area parking lot
- Hal Ramaley Memorial Park in Oak Harbor, WA. The Oak Harbor Garden Club maintains a Blue Star Memorial By-Way sign within the park.
- J. A. and Anna F. Smith Park, Tracyton, near the Kitsap County Fairgrounds. The marker was dedicated in 1988 by the Cross Sound District Garden Clubs. The marker has since been stolen.

=== Wyoming ===
Routes in Wyoming designated as Blue Star Memorial Highways include Interstate 25 (markers at Southeast Wyoming Information Center, exit 4, and at Chugwater Rest Area, exit 54), Interstate 80 (marker at Ft. Steele Rest Area, exit 228), I-25 Business Route through Douglas (marker near downtown on Yellowstone Highway), U.S. Route 85 (marker at Mule Creek Jct. Rest Area, mile marker 196). Blue Star Memorial markers are also located in Cody, Riverton and Worland.
