= Bianca Scacciati =

Italian opera singer

- Born: 3 July 1894; Florence, Italy
- Died: 15 October 1948 (aged 54) Brescia, Italy
- Occupations: operatic soprano
- Years active: 1917 - 1942

Bianca Scacciati (3 July 1894 in Florence – 15 October 1948 in Brescia) was an Italian operatic dramatic soprano, noted for her prominence in verismo.

Bianca Scacciati Et Francesco Merli, Giacomo Puccini, Turandot, In Questa Reggia, Columbia D1570

== Biography ==
Born into a family of opera-loving railwaymen, she showed her talents at singing from a very early age. Her abilities as a soprano was first recognised by the singing teacher Ernesta Bruschini, sister of the more famous Matilde Bruschini.

On 1 November 1917, only just turned 24, she made her debut at the Teatro della Pergola in Florence in the role of Margherita in Faust by Charles Gounod in the (sung in Italian), going on with the same role at the Teatro Comunale di Bologna, with such names as Alessandro Bonci (Faust), Vincenzo Bettoni (Mefistofele) and Luigi Piazza (Valentino).

On 27 July 1920, she sang at the Arena di Verona, in one of the first seasons of the theatre, in Boito's Mefistofele, alongside Nazzareno De Angelis, Aureliano Pertile, Linda Barla Ricci, directed by Piero Fabbroni.

In 1922 she played three important roles in the season of the Teatro Regio in Parma: Desdemona in Otello by Verdi, La Wally by Catalani and Margherita in Mefistofele. In the same year she played Margherita again in Mefistofele at the Teatro Carlo Felice in Genoa, with De Angelis and Pertile, conducted by Gino Marinuzzi.

In 1922 she made the first of her six tours in South America where, in order to replace an indisposed colleague, she had to perform Aida; in spite of the initial complexity, she obtained a resounding success with the critics and the audience.

At the Teatro alla Scala in Milan she performed, among other operas: in 1926 Turandot by Giacomo Puccini, in the title role, alongside the tenor Francesco Merli. In the same year also, in the role of Santuzza in Cavalleria rusticana, later Don Carlo, again Cavalleria rusticana, Siberia by Umberto Giordano, and Verdi's I Lombardi alla prima crociata.

In 1927 she made her debut at Covent Garden, London for the first London performance of Turandot by Giacomo Puccini, in the title role, alongside the tenor Merli.

At the Teatro Costanzi in Rome she triumphed in Tosca 1924, then also Turandot again in 1928, and again at the Teatro San Carlo, Naples in 1929.

On her debut in Rome with Turandot, she was invited by Mussolini to the Palazzo Venezia to be given a signed photograph by the Duce. She declined the invitation, stating her belief in her family's socialist viewpoint.

This 'disrespect' got her ostracised by theatres, so she was forced to continue her career singing mainly in South American theatres.

She also sang at the Teatro Colòn, Buenos Aires, in 1928, in Aida, Il Trovatore, Manon Lescaut and Un Ballo in Maschera. While in South America, she also sang in Rio de Janeiro and São Paulo, Brazil, in the late 1920s, alongside other famous singers.

In 1933 she married Giulio Poli and settled in Brescia, his hometown.

She retired in 1942, after finally having sung as Tosca at the Brescia Theatre.

== List of operas at La Scala ==
A regular presence at La Scala, she had been called by Arturo Toscanini for an audition in 1926, but had proudly refused, inviting the Maestro to the premiere of Don Carlo in Rome. The charm of her voice and her excellent stage presence impressed him, so much so that he immediately cast her.

The following are the operas performed by Scacciati at La Scala in the various years:

- December 1926 - Turandot (Giacomo Puccini) - Scacciati (then Llácer) (Turandot), Franco Lo Giudice (then Merli, then Melandri) (Calaf), Zamboni (later Pampanini) (Liù), Walter (Timur) - Dir. Panizza
- December 1927 - Cavalleria Rusticana (Pietro Mascagni) - Merli (Turiddu), Scacciati (Santuzza) - Dir. Toscanini
- January 1928 - Turandot (Giacomo Puccini) - Scacciati (Turandot), Merli (Calaf) (later Kiepura), Pampanini (Liù), Walter (Timur) - Dir. Panizza
- April 1928 - Don Carlo (Giuseppe Verdi) - Trantoul (Don Carlo), Pasero (Filippo II), Stignani (Eboli), Galeffi (Rodrigo), Walter (Grand Inquisitor) - Dir. Toscanini
- December 1928 - Tosca (Giacomo Puccini) - Pertile (then Granda, then Kiepura) (Cavaradossi), Stabile (then Galeffi) (Scarpia), Baccaloni - Dir. Santini
- March 1929 - Turandot (Giacomo Puccini) - Scacciati (Turandot), Favero (Liù), Thill (Calaf), Walter (Timur) - Dir. Panizza
- March 1929 - Un Ballo in Maschera (Giuseppe Verdi) - Pertile (Riccardo), Scacciati (Amelia), Minghini Cattaneo (Ulrica), Galeffi (Renato), Baccaloni (Tom) - Dir. Santini
- December 1929 - La Vestale (Gaspare Spontini) - Arangi-Lombardi (then Vera Amerighi Rutili) (La Gran Vestale) Molinari (Cinna), Scacciati (Giulia), Vaghi (Sommo sacerdote) - Dir. Guarnieri
- December 1929 - La Forza del Destino (Giuseppe Verdi) - Scacciati (Leonora), Pertile (Don Alvaro), Stignani (Preziosilla), Molinari (Don Carlo), Marone (Padre Guardiano) - Dir. Del Campo
- January 1930 - Turandot (Giacomo Puccini) - Scacciati (Turandot), Thill (Calaf), Saraceni (Liù), Walter (Timur) - Dir. Del Campo
- February 1930 - Il Trovatore (Giuseppe Verdi) - Lauri-Volpi (later Merli) (Il Conte di Luna), Scacciati (Leonora), Franci (Conte di Luna), A. Dal Monte (later Stignani) (Azucena) - Dir. Guarnieri
- December 1930 and January 1931 - I Lombardi alla Prima Crociata (Giuseppe Verdi) - Merli (Oronte), Scacciati (Giselda), Ciani (Arvino), Sabat (Acciano), Vaghi (Pagano and L'eremita)
- December 1930 - La Forza del Destino (Giuseppe Verdi) - Scacciati (Leonora), Merli (Don Alvaro), Galeffi (Don Carlo), Vaghi (Padre Guardiano) - Dir. Del Campo
- January 1931 - Aida (Giuseppe Verdi) - Scacciati (then Pacetti) (Aida), Stignani (Amneris), Merli (then Taccani) (Radames), Galeffi (Amonasro), Righetti (Ramfis) - Dir. Del Campo
- March 1931 - Norma (Vincenzo Bellini) - Scacciati (Norma), Mirassou (later Trantoul) (Pollione), Pasero (Oroveso), Stignani (Adalgisa) - Dir. Del Campo
- December 1931 and January 1932 - Norma (Vincenzo Bellini) - Scacciati (Norma), Pertile (Pollione), Stignani (Adalgisa), De Angelis (Oroveso) - Dir. Panizza (Only three of the four performances scheduled were carried out due to the indisposition of the tenor Verona, Pertile's double, who in turn was engaged in the evening performance of Fedora).
- April 1933 - Aida (Giuseppe Verdi) - Scacciati (then Cigna) (Aida), Pertile (Radames), Buades (Amneris), Franci (Amonasro), Santiago Font (Ramfis) - Dir. de Sabata

== Discography ==
=== Columbia ===
Some discs recorded by Columbia of Bianca Scacciati:

(Disc number, Side A and Side B, Ø = disc diameter in centimetres):

- D 12475 - Aida - Duet Rivedrai le foreste I | Aida - Rivedrai le foreste II.a parte (with baritone Augusto Beuf)
- D 12476 - Il Trovatore - Tacea la notte placida | Il Trovatore - D'amor sull'ali rosee - Ø 25
- D 12491 (and DQ 1067) - Mefistofele - L'altra notte in fondo al mare | Mefistofele - Spunta l'aurora pallida - Ø 25
- D 12517 (and GQ 7038) - Turandot - In questa reggia I part | Turandot - In questa reggia II part (with the tenor F. Merli) - Ø 25
- D 12518 (and CQ 709) - Cavalleria Rusticana - Voi lo sapete | Tosca - Vissi d'arte - Ø 25
- D 12519 - Manon Lescaut - In quelle trine morbide | Un ballo in maschera - Ma dall'arido stelo - Ø 25
- D 12555 (and GQ 7069) - La Bohème - Donde lieta uscì | Otello (Verdi) - Ora e per sempre (Tenore F.Merli) - Ø 25
- D 12576 (and DQ 1060) - La Gioconda - Suicidio! | La Wally - Ebben, ne andrò lontana - Ø 25
- D 12605 (and DQ 1117) - Il Trovatore - Tacea la notte placida | Il Trovatore - Cabaletta (Di tal amor)
- D 14712 (and GQX 10252) - Andrea Chenier - Act IV Duet La nostra morte (with tenor Francesco Merli) | Cavalleria Rusticana - Voi lo sapete o mamma - Ø 30
- D 14714 (and CQX 16502) - Andrea Chenier - La mamma morta (Sop. B.Scacciati) | Andrea Chenier - Un di m'era di gioia (Bar. M.Stabile) - Ø 30
- D 14691 (and GQX 10231) - La Bohème - Si, mi chiamano Mimì (Sop. B.Scacciati) | Il Barbiere di Siviglia - La Calunnia (Basso T. Pasero) - Ø 30
- D 15256 (and DQ 1132) - Aida - Ritorna vincitor I | Aida - Ritorna vincitor II.a parte
- D 18023 (and GQX 10161) - Tosca - O dolci mani | Tosca - Amaro sol per te - (with tenor Alessandro Granda) - Ø 30
- D 18027 (and GQX 10165) - Un ballo in maschera - Morrò, ma prima in grazia | Tosca - Vissi d'arte - Ø 30
- D 18064 (and GQX 10202) - Il Guarany - Sento una forza indomita I | Il Guarany - Sento una forza indomita II.a parte (with tenor Francesco Merli) - Ø 30
- D 18069 (and GQX 10206) - La Forza del Destino - Me pilgrim and orphan | Peace my God
- D 18076 (and GQX 10213) - La Forza del Destino - Terzetto Finale (with F.Merli and T.Pasero) (B) | Loreley - O forze recondite (A) - Ø 30
- GQX 10202 - Ruy Blas - Duetto Io che tentai | followed by Duetto O dolce voluttà (with tenor Francesco Merli) - Ø 30
- GQX 10203 - Lorely - Deh Ti rammento | Loreley - Vieni Deh Vieni (with tenor Francesco Merli) - Ø 30
- GQX 10206 - La Forza del Destino - Me pellegrina ed orfana | Pace mio Dio - Ø 30
- GQX 10212 - Andrea Chenier - Duet "Vicino a te" | cont'd Duet "La nostra morte" (with tenor Francesco Merli) - Ø 30
- GQX 10521 - I Lombardi alla Prima Crociata - Terzetto Qui posa il fianco | seguito Terzetto Qual voluttà trascorre (with F.Merli and T.Pasero, violin E.Minetti) - Ø 30
- N.B. (Reprints in brackets)
- La Cigale" London records (Columbia sub-brand)
- D 12713 - Cavalleria Rusticana - Voi lo sapete o mamma | Tosca - Vissi d'arte
- D 12719 - Turandot - In questa reggia | Turandot - Enigmi II.a parte (with tenor Francesco Merli)

==== Complete Works Columbia ====
- Puccini - Tosca - Bianca Scacciati, Alessandro Granda (Cavaradossi), Enrico Molinari (Scarpia), Salvatore Baccaloni (Angelotti), Aristide Baracchi, E.Venturini, T.Cortellino - Dir. Lorenzo Molajoli - M° del Coro V. Veneziani - 1929 - Double 78 rpm records Columbia D 14594/14607 - Ø 30
- Verdi - Il Trovatore - Francesco Merli, Bianca Scacciati, Enrico Molinari, Giuseppina Zinetti, Corrado Zambelli - Dir. Molajoli - Orchestra e Coro del Teatro alla Scala di Milano - Studio, 1930 - 78 rpm double discs Columbia GQX 10047/10060, reissued in 33 rpm Mono Columbia QCX 10143/4, EMI "Discoteca Classica" 3 C 153 03024/25(1978) and Rodolphe RPC 32 539/550 (2 CDs);

=== Other labels ===
==== Excelsius - Edizioni Ricordi ====
- RI 8127 - Cavalleria Rusticana - Voi lo sapete o mamma | Tosca - Vissi d'arte (conductor Paolo Lo Monaco, Professori d'Orchestra della Scala di Milano) - Matrici M/3636 and M/3637 - Ø 25

== Notes ==
Maybe the correct catalogue number is CQX 10502

== Bibliography ==
- G.dell'Ira - The Pisan opera firmament - Staderini Editions
- AA.VV. - Grande Enciclopedia della Musica Lirica - Longanesi & C. Periodici
- Bruno Tosi - Pertile una voce, un mito - CGS Edizioni Venezia
- Two hundred years of Teatro alla Scala - Chronology - Grafica Gutenberg Editrice
- Columbia General Records Catalogue April 1929
- General catalogue Columbia records December 1930
- General Disks Catalogue Columbia January–June 1937
