= In questa reggia =

Aria by the title character in Puccini's opera Turandot

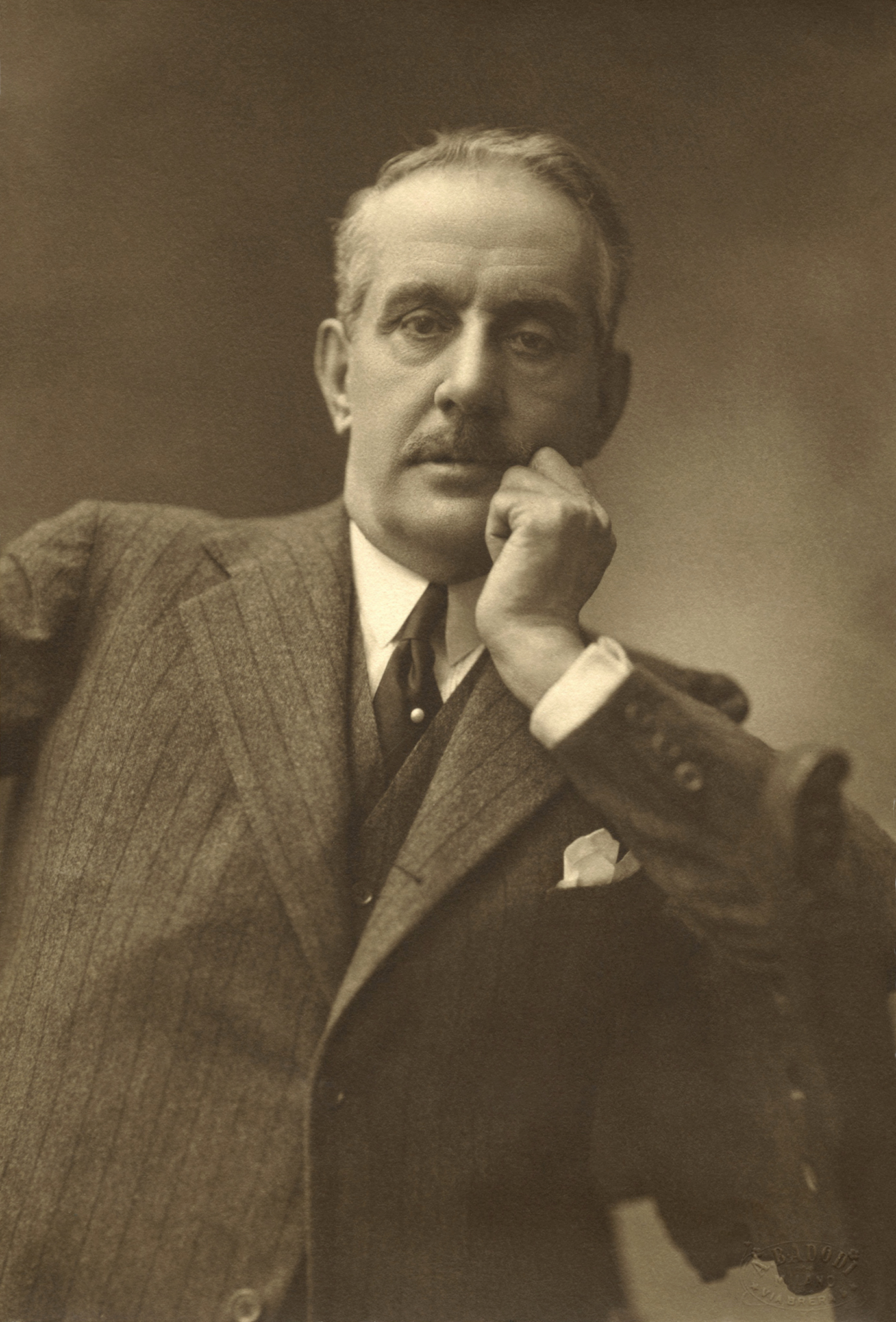
Giacomo Puccini in 1924

"In questa reggia" ("In this palace") is a soprano aria for the title character in Giacomo Puccini's opera Turandot set to a libretto in Italian by Giuseppe Adami and Renato Simoni. The text is based on Friedrich Schiller's adaptation of the play Turandot by Carlo Gozzi. Turandot's opening aria in this opera takes place in scene two of the second act, and is sung mostly by her, but with a reply from Calaf (tenor), which is a key point of the opera.

== The riddles challenge ==
In the aria, Turandot explains that she conceived the three riddles as a test for any prince who might want to marry her. She explains that in the same palace, countless generations ago (thousands of years ago), a reigning Princess Lou-Ling was conquered by the King of the Tartars, raped and murdered. In particular, she dwells upon the Princess' final crying out and her moment of death at the hands of a man. Based on the memory and the concept of that crying out having been carried down through the many generations to Turandot herself, she resolves to avenge that death by imposing it on all men who fail in the attempt to marry her. She warns the prince that if he fails to answer any one of the three riddles, he will die.

The climax of the aria occurs with the word "grido" ("outcry" or "crying out") and clearly Turandot is reliving and personifying the last moments of her ancestor, its outrage and its long awaited vengeance.

1926 recording
Bianca Scacciati and Francesco Merli

The orchestra emphasises her ominous final couplet:

Straniero! Non tentar la fortuna!
Gli enigmi sono tre, la morte una!

Stranger! Do not tempt Fortune!
The riddles are three, Death is one!

But Calaf returns this to her as

No, no... gli enigmi sono tre, una è la vita!

No, no... the riddles are three, Life is one!

Puccini developed the Chinese folk song "Mo Li Hua" (Jasmine Flower) into the leitmotif for Turandot's splendour. Some of the very distinctive music which ends this aria reappears briefly in the act 3 duet "Principessa di morte" (as completed by Alfano), as Calaf finally embraces a still-reluctant Turandot.

== Text ==
Turandot
In questa reggia,
or son mill'anni e mille,
un grido disperato risonò.
E quel grido,
traverso stirpe e stirpe
qui nell'anima mia si rifugiò!
Principessa Lou-Ling,
ava dolce e serena
che regnavi nel tuo cupo silenzio
in gioia pura,
e sfidasti inflessibile e sicura
l'aspro dominio,
oggi rivivi in me!

La folla
Fu quando il Re dei Tartari
le sette sue bandiere dispiegò.

Turandot
Pure nel tempo che ciascun ricorda,
fu sgomento e terrore e rombo d'armi.
Il regno vinto! Il regno vinto!
E Lou-Ling, la mia ava,
trascinata da un uomo
come te, come te, straniero,
là nella notte atroce
dove si spense la sua fresca voce!

La folla
Da secoli ella dorme
nella sua tomba enorme.

Turandot
O Principi,
che a lunghe carovane
d'ogni parte del mondo
qui venite a gettar la vostra sorte,
io vendico su voi,
quella purezza, quel grido
e quella morte!
Mai nessun, nessun m'avrà!
L'orror di chi l'uccise
vivi nel cuor mi sta!
No, no! Mai nessun m'avrà!
Ah, rinasce in me l'orgoglio
di tanta purità!
Straniero! Non tentar la fortuna!
Gli enigmi sono tre,
la morte una!

Calaf
No, no! Gli enigmi sono tre,
una è la vita!

Turandot
No, no! ...
... Gli enigmi sono tre, la morte è una!

Calaf
Gli enigmi sono tre,
una è la vita!

La folla
Al Principe straniero
offri la prova ardita,
o Turandot! Turandot!

Turandot
In this Palace,
thousands of years ago,
a desperate cry rang out.
And that cry,
after many generations,
took shelter in my spirit!
Princess Lo-u-Ling,
sweet, serene ancestress,
who ruled in your dark silence
with pure joy,
and challenged, sure and unyielding,
the harsh mastery of others,
today you live in me again!

The crowd
It was when the King of the Tartars
unfurled his seven flags!

Turandot
Still in the time all can recall,
there was alarm, terror, the rumble of arms!
The Kingdom defeated! defeated!
And Lo-u-ling, my ancestress,
dragged off by a man,
like you, like you, stranger,
there in the horrid night,
where her sweet voice was stilled!

The crowd
She's slept for centuries
in her huge tomb!

Turandot
O you princes,
with your long caravans
from every part of the world,
who come here to try your fate,
in you I avenge
that purity, that cry,
and that death!
No one will ever possess me!
The horror of her assassin
is still vivid in my heart!
No, no one will ever possess me!
Ah, in me is reborn the pride
of such purity!
Stranger, do not tempt Fate!
The enigmas are three,
but death is one!

Calaf
No, no! The enigmas are three,
and life is one!

Turandot
The enigmas are three,
but death is one!

Calaf
No, no! The enigmas are three,
and life is one!

The crowd
Offer the supreme test
to the foreign Prince,
O Turandot! Turandot!

== Historic recordings ==
Historic recordings go back nearly to the first performance, with those by Eva Turner being particularly notable. Turner was present at the first performance, and performed the opera seven months later and throughout the pre-war years.
