= María Ros =

Spanish operatic soprano

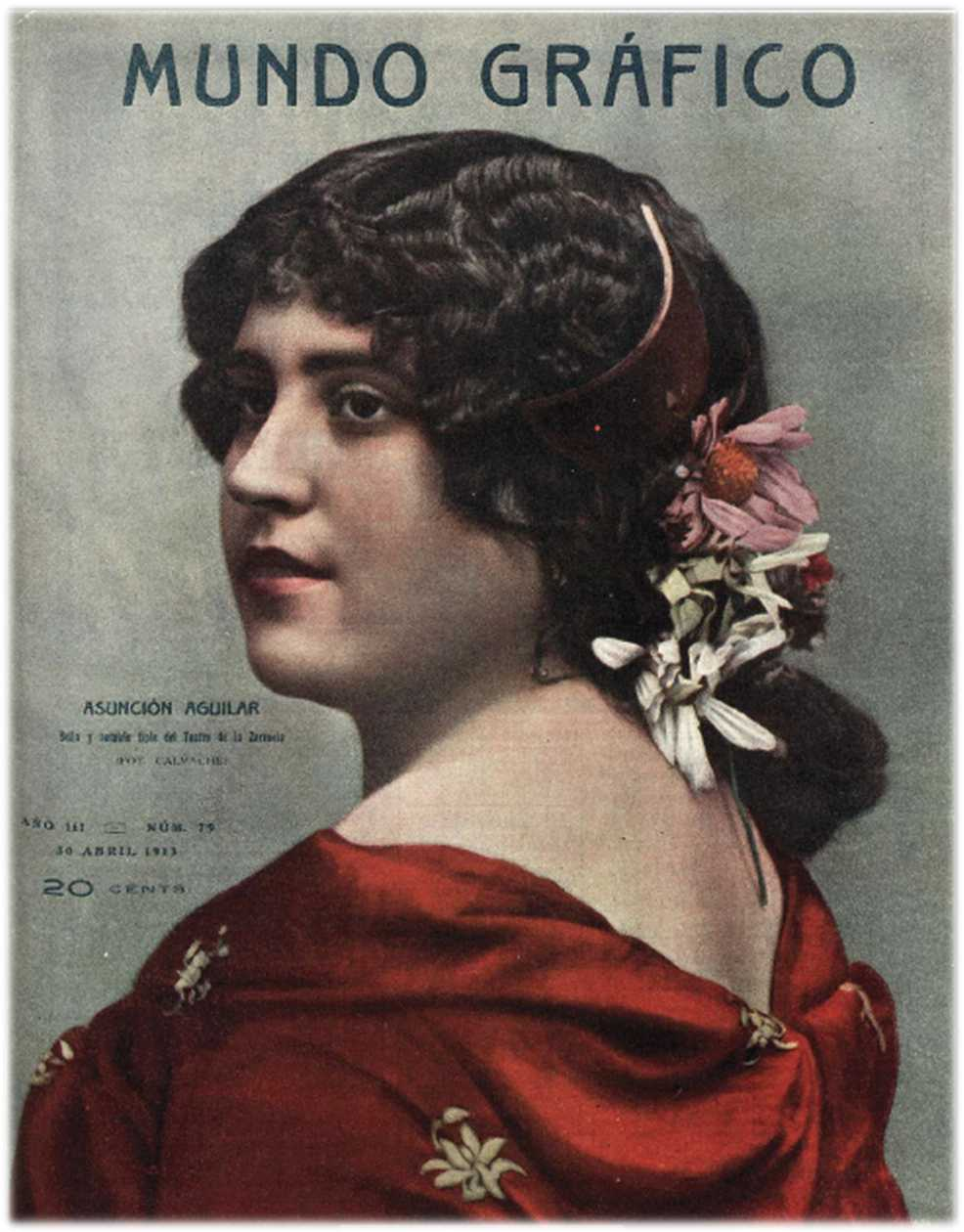
María Asunción Aguilar Ros in 1913

María Ros (16 May 1891 – 14 September 1970), full name María Asunción Aguilar Ros, was a Spanish operatic soprano.

== Life ==
Born in Alicante, Ros debuted as a singer on 14 July 1912, performing the second tiple part of the zarzuela by Amadeo Vives La Generala and having Luisa Rodríguez and Emilio Carreras, among others, as supporting cast members.

In 1915, she made her debut as an opera singer, performing in Valencia the opera Aida by Verdi. In 1918, she was contracted to sing in Teatro Colón in Buenos Aires the role of Sophie in Der Rosenkavalier by Richard Strauss, together with Gilda Dalla Rizza and replacing the already consecrated Amelita Galli-Curci. In 1921, she made her Italian debut in Ferrara, singing Rigoletto, with the acclaimed Benvenuto Franci and Giacomo Lauri-Volpi as his companions. For years, he sang under the direction of such famous conductors as Victor de Sabata, Gino Marinuzzi, Antonio Guarnieri and Vittorio Gui. She sang in many theatres in Europe and America, and it is worth noting her success in September 1922, with Il guarany, in the Municipal Theatre of Rio de Janeiro, with the company of Mascagni and Miguel Fleta.

In 1924, she married the famous Italian tenor Giacomo Lauri-Volpi, and took up residence in Burjassot. In 1926, she left the stage "to discipline her husband's voice", just when he was at the top of his career.

Educated at the school of Manuel García, her repertoire ranged from Rigoletto to Aida, not to mention La Tosca, La bohème, La traviata, Cavalleria rusticana, Pagliacci, Faust and Manon Lescaut.

Ros died in Burjasot on September 14, 1970, at the age of 79. In her honor, her husband Lauri-Volpi established a singing prize named after her: the "Maria Ros de Lauri Volpi International Singing Competition."
