= Giuseppe Danise =

Italian opera singer

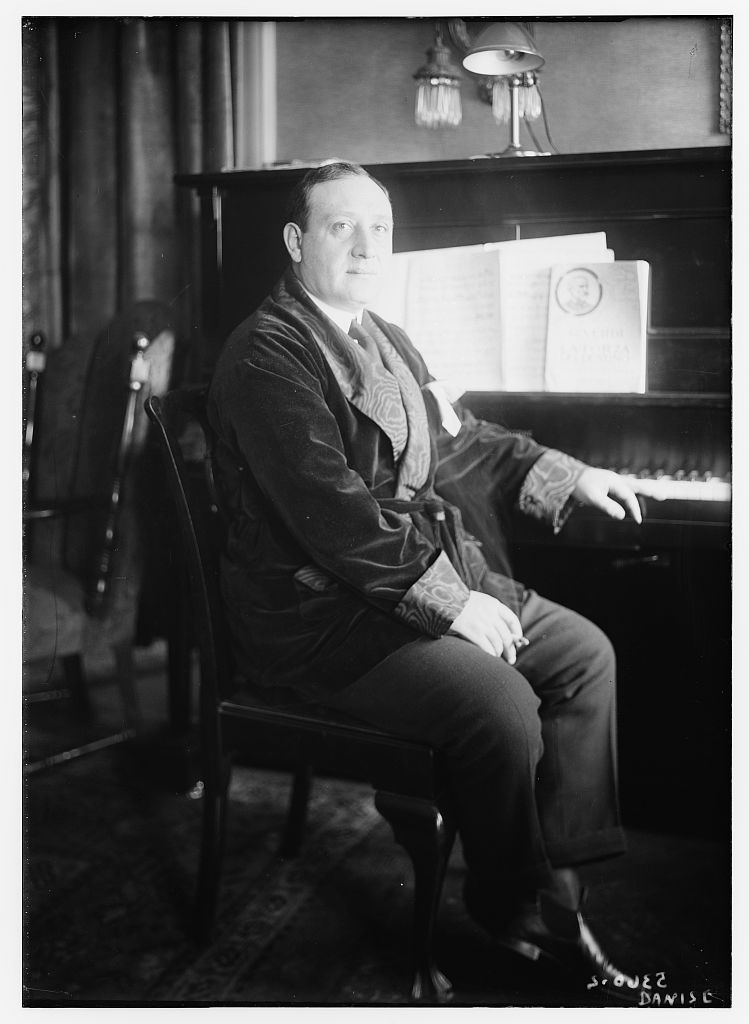
- Giuseppe Danise seated at the piano in his home in New York
- Born: 11 January 1882; Salerno, Kingdom of Italy
- Died: 9 January 1963 (aged 80)
- Occupation: Operatic baritone

Giuseppe Danise (11 January 1882 – 9 January 1963) was an Italian operatic baritone. He sang to great acclaim throughout Italy and the Americas, appearing in lyric and dramatic roles from the Italian, French, Wagnerian, and Russian repertoire.

== Education and early career ==
Danise was born in Salerno, near Naples, to Pasqualina Capaldo, an amateur musician, and Enrico Danise, an official in the Italian government. Though he began studies in law, he was urged to take up a career in singing, as he had a natural singing voice. He attended the Conservatorio di San Pietro a Majella in Naples, where he was trained first by Luigi Colonnese, a baritone of the previous generation whose own pedagogical lineage included Alessandro Busti and the castrato Girolamo Crescentini. According to Danise, for the first year he was only allowed to sing tones—no scales and no songs. Studies with Abramo Petillo followed. In 1905 Danise married Zelinda Raffaelo, and their first daughter, Floria, was born that year. A son, Enrico, was to follow in 1907.

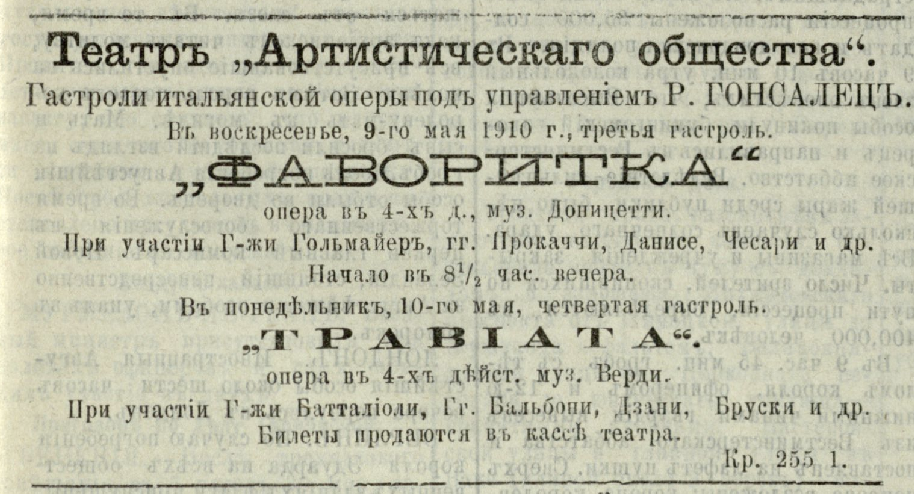
Advertisement in the May 9, 1910 edition of the Tbilisi-based Kavkaz: The Artistic Society Theater to a Gonsalez (Italian) Opera Company performance of La favorita, four-act opera with music by Donizetti. Singers listed include baritone Giuseppe Danise.

In 1906, he made his debut at the Teatro Bellini in Naples as Alfio in Cavalleria rusticana. Shortly thereafter he was hired as a leading baritone of the Gonsalez Opera Company, a touring company that traveled through the Balkans and throughout Russia and Siberia, as was described by the soprano Germana Di Giulio in Lanfranco Rasponi's The Last Prima Donnas. For at least part of the tour, the company included, among others, tenor Alessandro Procacci, soprano Giulietta Battaglioli, lyric soprano Ernestina Gonsalez, and bass Ignazio Cesari. In the course of his two and a half years with this company, Danise sang 630 performances.

He returned to Italy in May 1912. Two weeks later he sang a concert in Trieste and was engaged there for the fall season. After that, he was engaged to sing at the Teatro Regio di Torino. During that engagement he was asked to go to La Scala for the centennial of Verdi's birth. Danise refused this request over differences about the repertoire.

He continued building his Italian career to great success, singing in Bologna, Genoa, Rome, and Naples, among other places. He sang the role of Amonasro in Verdi's Aida at the opening of the Arena di Verona. In 1915 he performed at the Teatro Costanzi in Rome in the world premiere of the opera Una tragedia fiorentina by Mario Mariotti.

From May 1914 through September 1915, Danise sang primarily in South America, in theatres in Uruguay, Brasil, and Argentina, such as the Teatro Colón in Buenos Aires.

Back in Italy, the Italian arm of the His Master's Voice record company, La voce del padrone, made its first complete recording of Verdi's Rigoletto in May 1916, with Danise in the title role. Due to an unfortunate incident, however, some of the matrices were damaged before they made it to the fabrication process. The sections that were lost were re-recorded the following year with a different set of singers, Rigoletto being sung by Ernesto Badini. The complete but cobbled-together recording was issued in 1918 with the mixed cast.

Danise made his La Scala debut as the title role in the Scala premiere of Borodin's Prince Igor. He enjoyed great success in that house, opening a season with Spontini's Fernando Cortez and taking part in the Scala premiere of Zandonai's Francesca da Rimini and in the world premiere of Macigno by Vittorio De Sabata. In 1918, at the Teatro Costanzi in Rome, he sang in the world premiere of Vincenzo Michetti's Maria di Magdala.

Danise had to retire from the stage temporarily when he was conscripted to service in World War I. He was transferred from Milan to Rome, where he worked as a censor. During his stay in Rome, he sang at Teatro Costanzi (now known as the Teatro dell'Opera di Roma). It was at this time (1917–1918) that Danise first had occasion to sing with Beniamino Gigli, both performing in Cilea's Adriana Lecouvreur.

== North American career and Metropolitan Opera ==
Danise was released from military duty on a special conscription. He traveled to Chile and stayed in South America and Latin America during a short period that he referred to as his vagabondage. At this time the Metropolitan Opera's leading baritone, Pasquale Amato, was in decline. Danise received a letter from Giulio Gatti-Casazza, then the general manager of the company.

Danise made his debut at Metropolitan Opera in the role of Amonasro in Aida. There he starred in the Met premiere of Giordano's Andrea Chénier, Catalani's Loreley, Lalo's Le roi d'Ys, and La Habanéra by Raoul Laparra. Over the next twelve years, he sang in 425 performances with the Met, sometimes traveling with the company to perform in other cities America—Philadelphia, Atlanta, and Cleveland chief among them. He was paired with the greatest singers of the age, including Emmy Destinn, Rosa Ponselle, Claudia Muzio, Amelita Galli-Curci, Giovanni Martinelli, Beniamino Gigli, Giacomo Lauri-Volpi, and José Mardones.

From 1922 to 1931, he appeared every year at the Ravinia summer opera in Chicago.

In 1925, he married Ines Rognoni (a former ballerina at La Scala) in West New York, New Jersey. They later had two daughters, Aurora and Ebe. Also in 1925 the Supreme Court in Brooklyn issued an interlocutory decree of divorce to a Raffaela Danise. In lieu of alimony, Danise was made to pay her a complete financial settlement of $20,000.

From 1921 to 1927, Danise recorded dozens of arias, art songs, popular songs, and religious works for Brunswick Records. Most of them were done in the acoustic method, but a small handful of electrics show a voice of great sonority with an intense ring.

As a result of an economic crisis in 1932, the Metropolitan Opera began to reduce fees for its soloists, causing Danise not to renew his contract with the Metropolitan Opera.

He returned to Italy, performing again with great success at La Scala, now as Scarpia in Tosca and as Alfonso in Donizetti's La favorita; in 1933 at the Teatro Regio of Torino as Telramund in Lohengrin under Max von Schillings; as well as in 1933 at the Teatro Massimo Palermo as Scarpia; and in 1935 at the Teatro Carlo Felice Genova as Alfonso in La favorita. In the years 1935–37 he performed at the Opera of Rio de Janeiro as Scarpia, as Rigoletto, as Gianciotto in Francesca da Rimini, and as Germont père in La traviata alongside Brazilian soprano Bidu Sayão. His final performances were in 1939, as Germont in Traviata and Gérard in Andrea Chenier at São Paulo.

== After retirement ==
Danise and Sayão became companions, and he retired to look after her voice, career, and interests. In 1946, the two divorced their respective first spouses, were married in 1947, and then settled in the United States. While they maintained a summer home ("Casa Bidu") in Camden, Maine, their usual home was at the Ansonia Hotel in New York City, where Danise opened a voice studio. He taught, among others, Regina Resnik (guiding her from soprano to mezzo-soprano), baritone Giuseppe Valdengo, Barry Morell (guiding him from baritone to tenor), and bass Bonaldo Giaiotti.

Danise is buried next to Sayão's mother at the Woodlawn Cemetery in New York City.

== Repertoire ==
Roles Danise is known to have performed:

Sortable table
Composer Surname	Composer	Opera/Oratorio	Role
Bellini	Vincenzo Bellini	I puritani	Riccardo
Bizet	Georges Bizet	Carmen	Escamillo
Borodin	Alexander Borodin	Prince Igor	Prince Igor
Catalani	Alfredo Catalani	Loreley	Hermann
Cilea	Francesco Cilea	Adriana Lecouvreur	Michonnet
De Sabata	Victor de Sabata	Il macigno	Martano
Donizetti	Gaetano Donizetti	Don Pasquale	Dr. Malatesta
Donizetti	Gaetano Donizetti	La favorita	Alfonso
Donizetti	Gaetano Donizetti	Lucia di Lammermoor	Enrico
Franck	César Franck	Les Béatitudes	baritone
Gialdini	Gialdino Gialdini	La bufera	Mulaso
Giordano	Umberto Giordano	Andrea Chénier	Carlo Gérard
Giordano	Umberto Giordano	Fedora	De Siriex
Giordano	Umberto Giordano	Madame Sans-Gêne	Napoleon
Giordano	Umberto Giordano	Siberia	Gleby
Gomes	Antônio Carlos Gomes	Fosca	Cambro
Gomes	Antônio Carlos Gomes	Il Guarany	Gonzales
Gounod	Charles Gounod	Faust	Valentin
Lalo	Édouard Lalo	Le roi d'Ys	Karnac
Laparra	Raoul Laparra	La Habanera	Ramon
Leoncavallo	Ruggero Leoncavallo	Mimi Pinson	Marcello
Leoncavallo	Ruggero Leoncavallo	I pagliacci	Tonio
Leoncavallo	Ruggero Leoncavallo	Zazà	Cascart
Leroux	Xavier Leroux	Le chemineau (Il vagabondo)	Vagabondo
Leroux	Xavier Leroux	Les cadeaux de Noël (I doni di Natale)	Lean
Mariotti	Mario Mariotti	Una tragedia fiorentina	Simone
Mascagni	Pietro Mascagni	Cavalleria Rusticana	Alfio
Mascagni	Pietro Mascagni	Isabeau	Re Raimondo
Mascagni	Pietro Mascagni	L'amico Fritz	Rabbi David
Massenet	Jules Massenet	Le jongleur de Notre-Dame	Boniface
Massenet	Jules Massenet	Thaïs	Anthanaël
Meyerbeer	Giacomo Meyerbeer	Gli ugonotti	Conte di Nevers
Meyerbeer	Giacomo Meyerbeer	L'africana	Nelusko
Michetti	Vincenzo Michetti	Maria di Magdala	Giuda
Montemezzi	Italo Montemezzi	Giovanni Gallurese	Rivegas
Montemezzi	Italo Montemezzi	L'amore dei tre re	Manfredo
Mussorgsky	Modest Mussorgsky	The Fair at Sorochyntsi	Kum
Offenbach	Jacques Offenbach	Les contes d'Hoffmann	Coppelius/Miracle/Dapertutto
Pacchierotti	Ubaldo Pacchierotti	Il santo	Fedor
Ponchielli	Amilcare Ponchielli	La gioconda	Barnaba
Puccini	Giacomo Puccini	La bohème	Marcello
Puccini	Giacomo Puccini	La fanciulla del West	Jack Rance
Puccini	Giacomo Puccini	Tosca	Scarpia
Rossini	Gioacchino Rossini	Guglielmo Tell	Guglielmo Tell
Rossini	Gioacchino Rossini	Il barbiere di Siviglia	Figaro
Saint-Saëns	Camille Saint-Saëns	Samson et Dalila	High Priest of Dagon
Spontini	Gaspare Spontini	Fernando Cortez	Telasco
Thomas	Abroise Thomas	Hamlet (Amleto)	Hamlet
Verdi	Giuseppe Verdi	Aïda	Amonasro
Verdi	Giuseppe Verdi	Don Carlo	Rodrigo
Verdi	Giuseppe Verdi	Ernani	Don Carlo
Verdi	Giuseppe Verdi	Il trovatore	Conte Di Luna
Verdi	Giuseppe Verdi	La battaglia di Legnano	Rolando
Verdi	Giuseppe Verdi	La forza del destino	Don Carlo di Vargas
Verdi	Giuseppe Verdi	La traviata	Germont
Verdi	Giuseppe Verdi	Otello	Iago
Verdi	Giuseppe Verdi	Rigoletto	Rigoletto
Verdi	Giuseppe Verdi	Un ballo in maschera	Renato
Wagner	Richard Wagner	Götterdämmerung	Gunther
Wagner	Richard Wagner	Lohengrin	Telramund
Wolf-Ferrari	Ermanno Wolf-Ferrari	I gioielli della Madonna	Rafaele
Zandonai	Riccardo Zandonai	Francesca da Rimini	Gianciotto
