= Belfagor =

1923 opera by Ottorino Respighi

- Opera by Ottorino Respighi
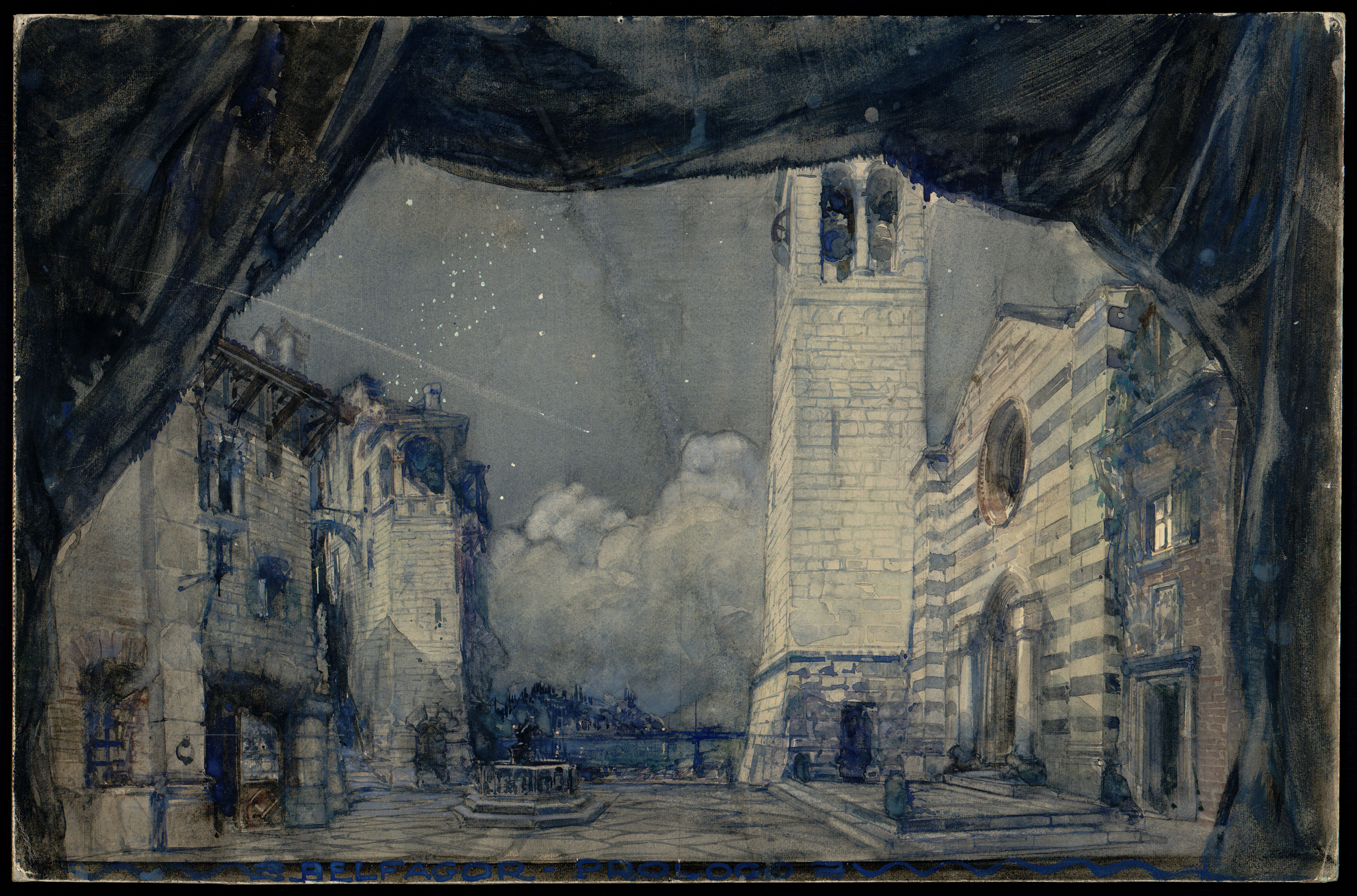
- Set design by Cesare Fratino for the Prologue in the first
- Librettist: Claudio Guastalla
- Language: Italian
- Based on: Belfagor by Ercole Luigi Morselli
- Premiere: 26 April 1923; La Scala, Milan

Belfagor (premiere 26 April 1923) is an Italian-language opera by the composer Ottorino Respighi to a libretto by Claudio Guastalla (1880–1948) based on the comedy Belfagor of Ercole Luigi Morselli (1882–1921), itself loosely based on the novella Belfagor arcidiavolo by Niccolò Machiavelli. It was premiered in 1923 at La Scala in Milan, under the baton of Antonio Guarnieri, since Toscanini was unavailable. The cast featured Irish soprano Margaret Burke Sheridan as Candida, tenor Francesco Merli as her lover Baldo, and baritone Mariano Stabile as the titular Belfagor, an arcidiavolo (Archdemon) who tries to marry a human maiden while in disguise as a nobleman, using gifts of money to her father.

The première obtained a "full and warm" approval, with several curtain calls for the composer, but the opinion of the critics was divided, ranging from the enthusiasm of Marinetti, enchanted by the futuristic aspects of the opera, and of the music critic S. A. Lucani, to those who judged the opera and libretto absolutely not enjoyable. Gaetano Cesari wrote that this work looked like an attempt, not fully accomplished, to merge in a comic opera "the fabolous and the clownish, the miraculous and the sentimental" and that the comic expressivity was damaged by the absence of "assertiveness of the melodic plan and its capacity to develop rapidly".

== Roles ==
Roles, voice types, premiere cast
Role	Voice type	Premiere cast, 26 April 1923
Candida	soprano	Margaret Sheridan
Baldo	tenor	Francesco Merli
Belfagor	baritone	Mariano Stabile
Mirocleto (father)	bass	Gaetano Azzolini
Olympia (mother)	mezzo-soprano	Anna Gramegna
Fidelia (sister)	soprano	Thea Vitulli
Maddalena (sister)	soprano	Cesira Ferrari
an old man	baritone	
a boy	soprano	
Menica	mezzo-soprano	Ida Mannarini
Don Biagio	bass	Giovanni Azzimonti
Majordomo	baritone	
1st companion	baritone	
2nd companion	baritone	
Chorus (SATTB)

== Instrumentation ==
Belfagor is scored for the following instruments:

piccolo, 2 flutes, 2 oboes, English horn, E-flat clarinet, 2 clarinets, 2 bassoons, double bassoon, 4 horns, 3 trumpets, 3 trombones, bass tuba, timpani, triangle, ratchet, drum, bass drum, cymbals, tam-tam, xylophone, handbells, bells, celesta, harp, strings.

== Synopsis ==
=== Prologue ===
Belfagor appears in a small village. He explains to the apothecary Mirocleto, who has three daughters of marriageable age, to be on a mission from the underworld. Belfagor has the task to discover if marriage is truly a hell for mankind, as many people arriving in the afterworld say. To accomplish his task Belfagor, who has a lot of money at his disposal, has to find a wife and spend ten years with her.

=== Act 1 ===
Belfagor turns up at Mirocleto's home, disguised as the handsome and immensely rich Ipsilonne. Fidelia and Maddalena are bewitched by Ipsilonne, but he chooses the third daughter, Candida, who instead shows disregard for him. Mirocleto and his wife, Olimpia, attracted by the money, consent to give Candida to Ipsilonne, but the girl is in despair, since she is in love with the sailor Baldo.

=== Act 2 ===
One month later, in a luxurious castle of Ipsilonne. Candida has been forced to marry Ipsilonne, but the marriage has not yet been consummated. Finally Candida, with the aid of Baldo, manages to flee, after making Ipsilonne believe that she would spend the night with him.

=== Epilogue ===
Candida and Baldo find refuge thanks to the provost. Belfagor appears again in the village, this time disguised as a vagabond. Belfagor makes the doubt creep in Baldo, letting him believe that Candida lost her virginity with Ipsilonne, who this way achieved his aim of having fun with a young maiden before disappearing. Candida tries vainly to convince Baldo that the vagabond is a liar. Baldo gives in to her pleas only when Candida, in despair, asks the Madonna for a miracle, and the bells start playing by themselves.

== Recordings ==
1989: Lamberto Gardelli, Hungarian Radio and Television Chorus. Hungarian State Orchestra, CD Hungaroton HCD 12850-51

Candida: Sylvia Sass
Baldo: Giorgio Lamberti
Belfagor: Lajos Miller

Mirocleto: László Polgár
Olimpia: Klára Takács
Fidelia: Magda Kalmár
Maddalena: Mária Zempléni
