= Turandot =

1926 opera by Giacomo Puccini

- Opera by Giacomo Puccini
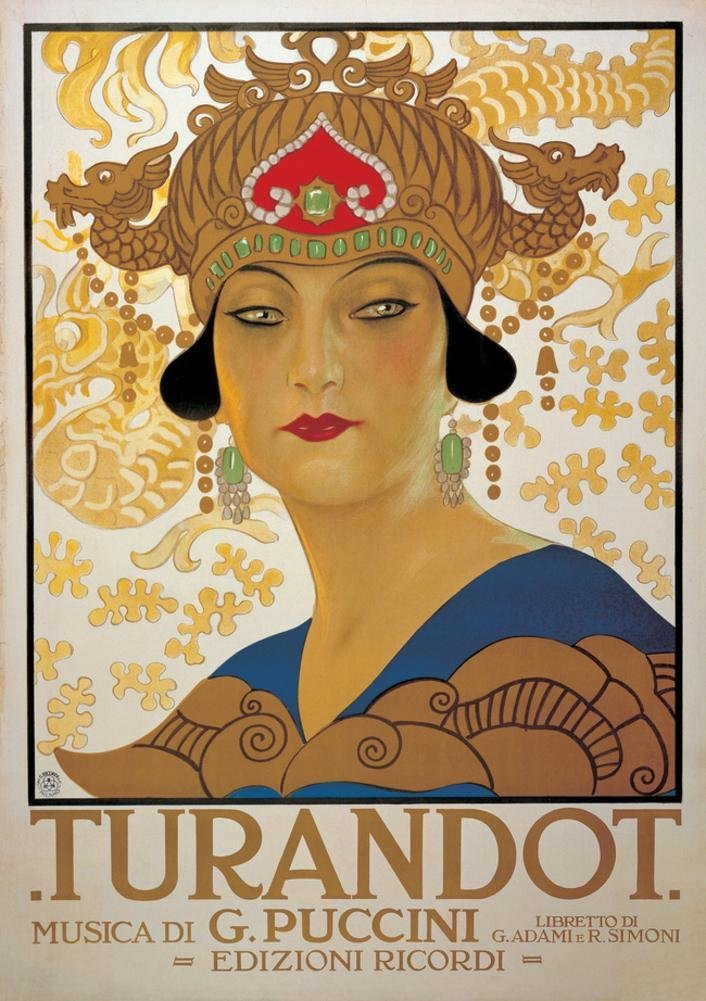
- The cover of the score printed by Ricordi
- Librettist: Giuseppe Adami; Renato Simoni
- Language: Italian
- Based on: Carlo Gozzi's play Turandot
- Premiere: 25 April 1926; Teatro alla Scala, Milan

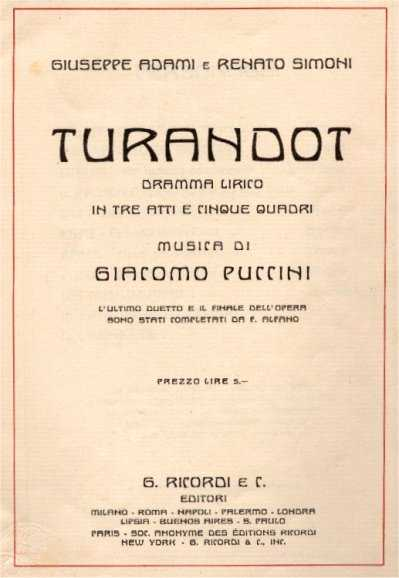
Libretto, 1926

Turandot (Italian pronunciation: [turanˈdo] or [turanˈdɔt]; see below) is an opera in three acts by Giacomo Puccini to a libretto in Italian by Giuseppe Adami and Renato Simoni. Puccini died in 1924, and his opera was left unfinished. The music was completed by Franco Alfano and premiered on 25 April 1926, almost a year and a half after Puccini's death. The opera is set in China and follows the Prince Calaf, who falls in love with the cold-hearted Princess Turandot. In order to win her hand in marriage, a suitor must solve three riddles, with a wrong answer resulting in his execution. Calaf passes the test, but Turandot refuses to marry him. He offers her a way out: if she is able to guess his name before dawn the next day, he will accept death.

== Origin and pronunciation of the name ==
The title of the opera is derived from the Persian term Turāndokht (توراندخت, pronounced [tuːɾɒːnˈdoxt]; lit. 'daughter of Turan'), a name frequently given to Turkish princesses in Persian poetry. Turan is a region of Central Asia that was once part of the Persian Empire. Dokht is a contraction of dokhtar (دختر, 'daughter'); in Persian, both the kh and t (خ and ت respectively) are pronounced.

Italian pronunciation dictionaries recommend pronouncing the final t. However, according to Puccini scholar Patrick Vincent Casali, the t is silent in the name of the opera and of its title character. Soprano Rosa Raisa, who created the title role, said that neither Puccini nor Arturo Toscanini, who conducted the first performances, ever pronounced the final t. Similarly, prominent Turandot Eva Turner did not pronounce the final t in television interviews. Casali maintains that the musical setting of many of Calaf's utterances of the name makes sounding the final t all but impossible.

== Composition history ==
The beginnings of Turandot can likely be found in Haft Peykar, a twelfth-century epic by the Persian poet Nizami. One of the stories in Haft Peykar features a Russian princess. In 1722, François Pétis de la Croix published his Les Mille et un jours (transl. The Thousand and One Days), a collection of stories which were purportedly taken from a XV Century Turkish collection called Ferec baʿde şidde ("Relief After Hardship"), and some other Middle Eastern folklore. One of these stories, believed to be inspired by Nizami, features a cold princess named Turandokht. The original tale in the turkish Ferec baʿde şidde was called "The prince Khalaf, His parents, and their adventures". The tale was also presente in the persian collection called Jāmiʿ al-ḥikāyāt that are prototypes of the Ferec. However, Croix modified many of the original story, renaming it Calaf et Tou-randocte. De la Croix's story was adapted into a play, Turandot, by the Italian playwright Carlo Gozzi in 1762, which was then adapted by Friedrich Schiller into another play in 1801. It was Schiller's version that inspired Puccini to write the opera.

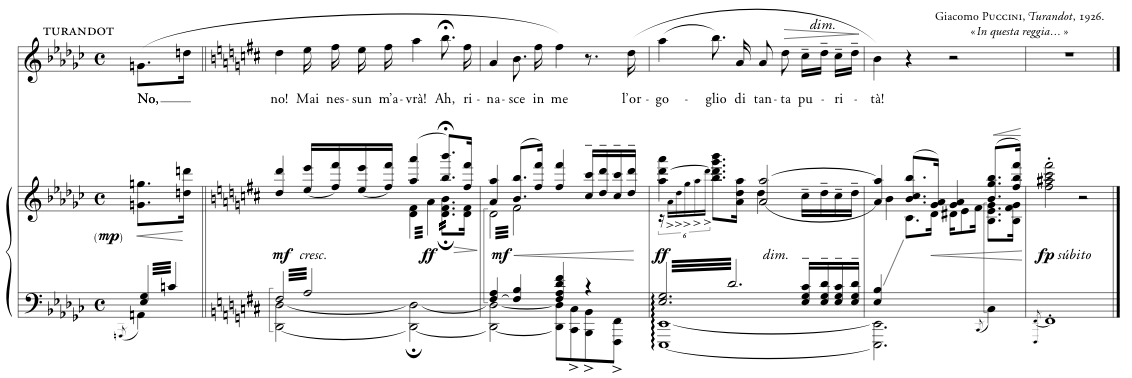
"In questa reggia" – quotation from the reduced score

Puccini began working on Turandot in March 1920 after meeting with librettists Giuseppe Adami and Renato Simoni. In his impatience, he began composition in January 1921, before Adami and Simoni had produced the text for the libretto. As with Madama Butterfly, Puccini strove for a semblance of authenticity by using music from the region, even commissioning a set of thirteen custom-made gongs. Baron Edoardo Fassini-Camossi, the former Italian diplomat to China, gave Puccini a music box that played four Chinese melodies. Puccini incorporated three of these melodies into his opera, the most memorable of which is the folk melody "Mòlìhuā" (Chinese: 茉莉花, lit. 'Jasmine Flower'). "Mòlìhuā" serves as a leitmotif for Princess Turandot's splendor. In total, eight of the themes from Turandot appear to be based on traditional Chinese music and anthems.

By March 1924, Puccini had completed the opera up to the final duet. However, he was dissatisfied with the text of the final duet, and did not continue until 8 October, when he chose Adami's fourth version of the duet text. Two days later, he was diagnosed with throat cancer. Puccini seems to have had some inkling of the seriousness of his condition: before leaving for Brussels for treatment, he visited Arturo Toscanini and begged him, "Don't let my Turandot die." He died of a heart attack on 29 November 1924.

=== Completion of the score after Puccini's death ===
When Puccini died, the first two of the three acts were fully composed, including the orchestration. Puccini had composed and fully orchestrated act three up until Liù's death and funeral cortege. In the sense of finished music, this was the last music composed by Puccini. He left behind 36 pages of sketches on 23 sheets for the end of Turandot. Some sketches were in the form of "piano-vocal" or "short score", including vocal lines with "two to four staves of accompaniment with occasional notes on orchestration." These sketches provided music for some, but not all, of the final portion of the libretto.

Toscanini recommended that Riccardo Zandonai be engaged to finish the opera. Puccini's son Tonio objected, and eventually Franco Alfano was chosen to flesh out the sketches after Vincenzo Tommasini (who had completed Boito's Nerone after the composer's death) and Pietro Mascagni were rejected. Puccini's publisher Tito Ricordi II decided on Alfano because his opera La leggenda di Sakùntala resembled Turandot in its setting and heavy orchestration. Alfano provided a first version of the ending with a few passages of his own, and even a few sentences added to the libretto, which was not considered complete even by Puccini. After the severe criticisms by Ricordi and the conductor Arturo Toscanini, he was forced to write a second, strictly censored version that followed Puccini's sketches more closely, to the point where he did not set some of Adami's text to music because Puccini had not indicated how he wanted it to sound. Ricordi's real concern was not the quality of Alfano's work; he wanted the end of Turandot to sound as if it had been written by Puccini. Of this version, about three minutes were cut for performance by Toscanini, and it is this shortened version that is usually performed today.

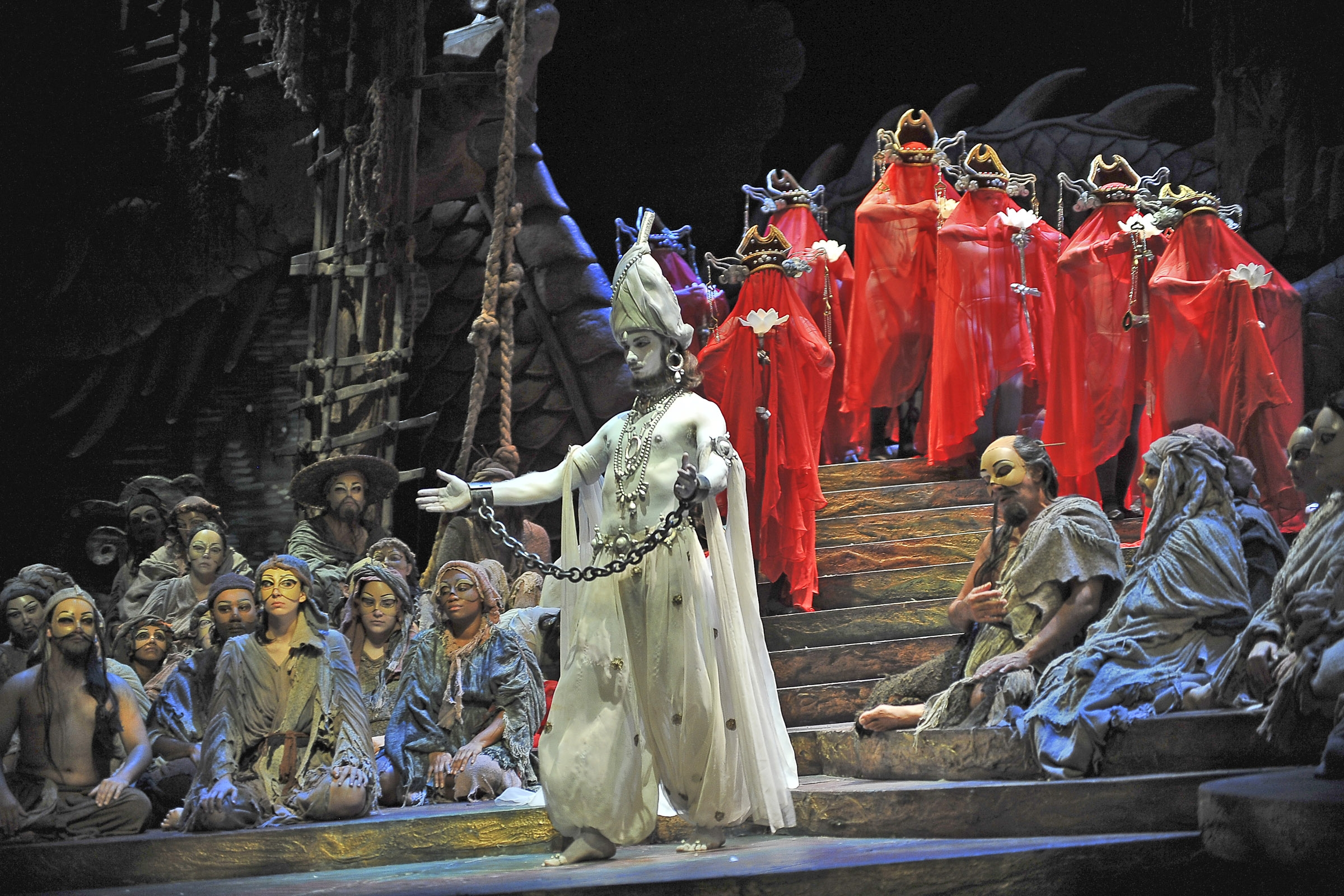
Prince of Persia in Turandot, Florida Grand Opera

== Performance history ==
Turandot premiered at the La Scala opera house in Milan, Italy, on 25 April 1926, a year and five months after Puccini's death. Rosa Raisa played Turandot. Tenors Miguel Fleta and Franco Lo Giudice alternated in the role of Prince Calaf, with Fleta singing the role on opening night. It was conducted by Arturo Toscanini. In the middle of act 3, the orchestra stopped playing. Toscanini turned to the audience and announced, "Qui finisce l'opera, perché a questo punto il maestro è morto" (transl. Here the opera ends, because at this point the maestro died). The curtain was then lowered. A reporter for La Stampa recorded the words slightly differently: "Qui finisce l'opera, rimasta incompiuta per la morte del povero Puccini" ("transl. Here the opera ends, left incomplete by the death of the poor Puccini"). Others have reported that Toscanini said, "Here, the Maestro laid down his pen." A newspaper report from 1926 states that Puccini asked Toscanini to stop the opera performance in the middle of act 3. The second and subsequent performances of the 1926 La Scala season included Alfano's ending.

Soon after its premiere in Milan, Turandot spread to other cities.

City	Location	Date of first performance	Starring Turandot/Calaf	Conductor	Other information
Milan, Italy	La Scala	25 April 1926	Rosa Raisa; Miguel Fleta and Franco Lo Giudice (alternating)	Arturo Toscanini (premiere, and possibly second and third performances); Ettore Panizza (all performances after Toscanini's departure)	Sources disagree on which conductor led the second and third performances. Toscanini biographer Harvey Sachs claims that Toscanini conducted the second and third performances before withdrawing due to nervous exhaustion. Other authors believe that Toscanini left after the first performance.
Rome, Italy	Teatro Costanzi	29 April 1926	Bianca Scacciati; Francesco Merli	Edoardo Vitale	
Buenos Aires, Argentina	Teatro Colón	23 June 1926	Claudia Muzio; Giacomo Lauri Volpi	Gino Marinuzzi	
Dresden, Germany	Staatsoper Dresden	6 September 1926	Anne Roselle; Richard Tauber	Fritz Busch	Performed in German
Venice, Italy	La Fenice	9 September 1926	María Llácer-Casali; Antonio Bagnariol	Gaetano Bavagnoli	
Vienna, Austria	Vienna State Opera	14 October 1926	Lotte Lehmann; Leo Slezak	Franz Schalk	
Berlin, Germany	Staatsoper Berlin	8 November 1926	Mafalda Salvatini; Carl Martin Öhman	Bruno Walter	
New York City, United States	Metropolitan Opera	16 November 1926	Maria Jeritza; Giacomo Lauri Volpi	Tullio Serafin	
Brussels, Belgium	La Monnaie	17 December 1926	Jane Bonavia; Victor Verteneuil	Corneille de Thoran	Performed in French.
Trieste, Italy	Teatro Verdi	22 December 1926	Linda Barla Ricci; Pedro Mirassou	Gennaro Papi	
Naples, Italy	Teatro di San Carlo	17 January 1927	Bianca Scacciati; Antonio Bagnariol	Edoardo Vitale	
Parma, Italy	Teatro Regio	12 February 1927	Elena Barrigar; Franco Lo Giudice	Giuseppe Podestà	
Bern, Switzerland	Bern Theatre	13 February 1927	Maria Nezádal; Peter Baust	Dr. Albert Nef	
Turin, Italy	Teatro Regio	17 March 1927	Linda Barla Ricci; Gennaro Barra-Caracciolo	Gino Marinuzzi	
Baltimore, Maryland, USA	Lyric Theatre Baltimore	18 April 1927	Florence Easton; Edward Johnson	Tullio Serafin	
Florence, Italy	Politeama Fiorentino	23 April 1927			
Atlanta, Georgia, USA	Municipal Auditorium	27 April 1927	Florence Easton; Edward Johnson	Tullio Serafin	
Cleveland, Ohio, USA	Public Auditorium	3 May 1927	Florence Easton; Armand Tokatyan	Tullio Serafin	
London, United Kingdom	Covent Garden	8 June 1927	Bianca Scacciati; Francesco Merli	Vincenzo Bellezza	
San Francisco, United States	San Francisco Opera	19 September 1927	Anne Roselle; Armand Tokatyan	Gaetano Merola	
Bologna, Italy	Teatro Comunale di Bologna	29 October 1927	Linda Barla-Ricci; Antonio Melandri	Gino Marinuzzi	
Budapest, Hungary	Operaház	14 November 1927	Vilma Tihanyi; Székelyhidy Ferenc	Nándor Rékai	
Baku, Azerbaijan (then Transcaucasian SFSR, Soviet Union)	Baku Opera	March 1928		Alexander Klibson	Performed in Russian(?).
Paris, France	Paris Opera	29 March 1928	Maryse Beaujon; Georges Thill	Philippe Gaubert	
Verona, Italy	Verona Arena	28 July 1928	Anne Roselle; George Thill	Alfredo Padovani	
Australia	His Majesty's Theatre, Melbourne	9 June 1928	Giannina Arangi-Lombardi; Francesco Merli	Gaetano Bavagnoli	
Kyiv, Ukraine (then Ukrainian SSR, Soviet Union)	Kyiv Opera	September 1928		Aleksander Orlov	Performed in Ukrainian
Barcelona, Spain	Gran Teatre del Liceu	30 December 1928	Iva Pacetti; Antonio Melandri	Alfredo Padovani	
Belgrade, Serbia	National Theatre	28 June 1930		Lovro von Matačić	
Moscow, Russia (then Russian SFSR, Soviet Union)	Bolshoi Theatre	12 December 1931	Kseniya Derzhinskaya; Boris Evlakhov	Lev Steinberg	Performed in Russian, translated by Pavel Antokolsky, 39 performances until 1934

For many years, the government of the People's Republic of China forbade performance of Turandot because they said it portrayed China and the Chinese unfavourably. Instead of a single nationwide decree against it, any attempts to produce it were not approved. In the late 1990s they relented, and in September 1998 the opera was performed for eight nights as Turandot at the Forbidden City, complete with opulent sets and soldiers from the People's Liberation Army as extras. It was an international collaboration, with director Zhang Yimou as choreographer and Zubin Mehta as conductor. The singing roles saw Giovanna Casolla, Audrey Stottler, and Sharon Sweet as Princess Turandot; Sergej Larin and Lando Bartolini as Calaf; and Barbara Frittoli, Cristina Gallardo-Domâs, and Barbara Hendricks as Liù.

The aria "Nessun dorma" has long been a staple of operatic recitals. Luciano Pavarotti popularised the piece beyond the opera world in the 1990s with his performance of it for the 1990 World Cup, which received a global audience. Both Pavarotti and Plácido Domingo released singles of the aria, with Pavarotti's reaching number 2 in the UK. The Three Tenors performed the aria at three subsequent World Cup Finals, in 1994 in Los Angeles, 1998 in Paris, and 2002 in Yokohama. Many crossover and pop artists have performed and recorded it and the aria has been used in the soundtracks of numerous films. Turandot is a staple of the standard operatic repertoire and it appears as number 17 on the Operabase list of the most-performed operas worldwide.

=== Alfano's and other versions ===
The debate over which version of the ending is better is still open. Alfano's original ending to the opera was first recorded (as part of an album with Josephine Barstow singing final scenes of several operas) by John Mauceri and Scottish Opera (with Josephine Barstow and Lando Bartolini as soloists) recorded for Decca Records in 1989 to great acclaim. However, it may have been staged in Germany in the early years, since Ricordi had commissioned a German translation of the text and a number of scores were printed in Germany with the full final scene included. Alfano's second ending has been further redacted as well: Turandot's aria "Del primo pianto" was performed at the premiere but cut from the first complete recording; it was eventually restored to most performances of the opera.

From 1976 to 1988, the American composer Janet Maguire, convinced that the whole ending is coded in the sketches left by Puccini, composed a new ending, but this has never been performed.

In 2001, Luciano Berio made a new completion sanctioned by Casa Ricordi and the Puccini estate, using Puccini's sketches but also expanding the musical language. It was subsequently performed in the Canary Islands and Amsterdam conducted by Riccardo Chailly, Los Angeles conducted by Kent Nagano, at the Salzburg Festival conducted by Valery Gergiev in August 2002. Alex Ross, in The New Yorker, notes that the new ending by Berio is preferred by some critics for making a more satisfactory resolution of Turandot's change of heart, and of being more in keeping with Puccini's evolving technique. However, its reception was mixed.

In late 2007, Chinese composer Hao Weiya made another completion before the opening of National Centre for the Performing Arts, also resulting in a mixed reception.

In 2022, Deborah Burton "realised" a finale to Turandot that utilised several of Puccini's autograph sketches that had not been previously studied. Based on decades of analyzing Puccini's compositional style, her finale has not yet been produced, although some possible venues are in the offing.

In 2024, Washington National Opera premiered a newly commissioned ending by composer Christopher Tin and librettist Susan Soon He Stanton to very positive reviews. Michael Andor Brodeur of The Washington Post called the production "refreshing" and declared "Even without the new ending — and Tin’s splendid musical additions, which draw sensibly from Puccini’s score while applying an entirely new emotional finish — Francesca Zambello's Turandot crackles with fresh energy". Heidi Waleson of The Wall Street Journal wrote that the new ending "fits the opera neatly. Its sound and attitude, while contemporary, grow organically from Puccini’s original, like a savvy modern addition on a historic building."

In 2024, Opera Delaware premiered a newly commissioned completion by composer Derrick Wang, which was praised as "adept," "respectful," and "seamless."

Daniela Kerck made another version for the Hessisches Staatstheater Wiesbaden in 2024, using exclusively music by Puccini, the unfinished opera followed by his 1905 Requiem antiphone. She identified Calaf with Puccini, and other characters with people from his life, beginning and ending the story in Puccini's library with a grand piano. In this version, when Liù has taken her life and the music by Puccini ends, the Puccini on stage receives a kiss of death from Turandot and dies.

== Roles ==
Roles, voice types, premier cast
Role	Voice type	Premiere cast, 25 April 1926 Conductor: Arturo Toscanini
Princess Turandot	dramatic soprano	Rosa Raisa
The Emperor Altoum, her father	tenor	Francesco Dominici
Timur, the deposed King of Tartary	bass	Carlo Walter
The Unknown Prince (Calaf), his son	tenor	Miguel Fleta
Liù, (Note: Note that the grave accent (`) in the name Liù is not a pinyin tone mark indicating a falling tone, but an Italian diacritic that marks stress, indicating that the word is pronounced [ˈlju] or [liˈu] rather than [ˈliːu]. If the name is analyzed as an authentic Mandarin-language name, it is likely to be one of several characters pronounced Liu (with different tones), commonly used as surnames: 劉 Liú [ljôu] or 柳 Liǔ [ljòu]. A translation of the song guide hosted by the National Taiwan University refers to her as 柳兒 Liǔ ér.) a slave girl	soprano	Maria Zamboni
Ping, Lord Chancellor	baritone	Giacomo Rimini
Pang, Majordomo	tenor	Emilio Venturini
Pong, Head chef of the Imperial Kitchen	tenor	Giuseppe Nessi
A Mandarin	baritone	Aristide Baracchi
The Prince of Persia	tenor	Not named in the original program
The Executioner (Pu-Tin-Pao)	silent	Not named in the original program
Imperial guards, the executioner's men, boys, priests, mandarins, dignitaries, eight wise men, Turandot's handmaids, soldiers, standard-bearers, musicians, ghosts of suitors, crowd

== Synopsis ==
Place: Peking, China
Time: Legendary times

=== Act 1 ===
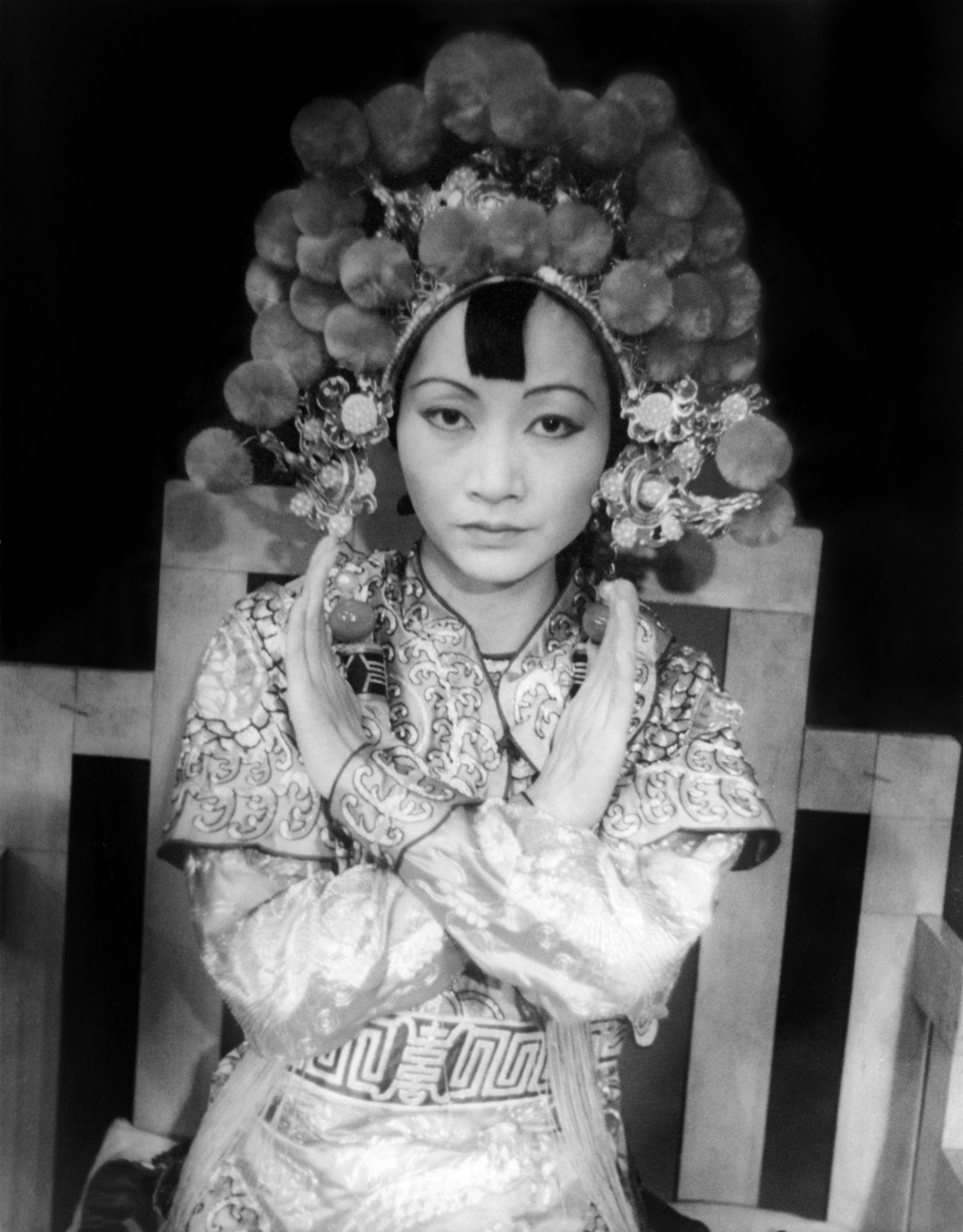
Anna May Wong as Princess Turandot in a 1937 dramatic adaptation of Gozzi's Turandot at the Westport Country Playhouse

In front of the imperial palace

In China, the beautiful Princess Turandot will marry only a suitor who can answer three riddles. A Mandarin announces the law of the land (Aria – "Popolo di Pechino!" – "People of Peking!"). The Prince of Persia has failed to answer the three riddles, and he is to be beheaded at the next rising moon. As the crowd surges towards the gates of the palace, the imperial guards brutally repulse them, causing a blind old man to be knocked to the ground. The old man's slave-girl, Liù, cries out for help. A young man hears her cry and recognises that the old man is his long-lost father, Timur, the deposed king of Tartary. The young Prince of Tartary is overjoyed at seeing Timur alive, but still urges Timur not to speak his name because he is afraid that the Chinese rulers, who have conquered Tartary, may kill or harm them. Timur then tells his son that, of all his servants, only Liù has remained faithful to him. When the Prince asks her why, she tells him that once, long ago in the palace, the Prince had smiled at her (Trio with chorus – The crowd, Liù, Prince of Tartary, Timur: "Indietro, cani!" – "Back, dogs!").

The moon rises, and the crowd's cries for blood dissolve into silence. The doomed Prince of Persia, who is on his way to be executed, is led before the crowd. The young Prince is so handsome and kind that the crowd and the Prince of Tartary decide that they want Turandot to act compassionately, and they beg Turandot to appear and spare his life (Aria – The crowd, Prince of Tartary: "O giovinetto!" – "O youth!"). She then appears, and with a single imperious gesture, orders the execution to continue. The Prince of Tartary, who has never seen Turandot before, falls immediately in love with her, and joyfully cries out Turandot's name three times, foreshadowing the riddles to come. Then the Prince of Persia cries out Turandot's name one final time, mirroring the Prince of Tartary. The crowd, horrified, screams out one final time and the Prince of Persia is beheaded.

"Non piangere, Liù", Alejandro Granda Relayza

The Prince of Tartary is dazzled by Turandot's beauty. He is about to rush towards the gong and to strike it three times – the symbolic gesture of whoever wishes to attempt to solve the riddles so that he can marry Turandot – when the ministers Ping, Pang, and Pong block him. They urge him cynically not to lose his head for Turandot and instead to go back to his own country ("Fermo, che fai?" – "Stop, what are you doing?"). Timur urges his son to desist, and Liù, who is secretly in love with the Prince, pleads with him not to attempt to solve the riddles ("Signore, ascolta!" – "Lord, hear!"). Liù's words touch the Prince's heart. He begs Liù to make Timur's exile more bearable by not abandoning Timur if the Prince fails to answer the riddles ("Non piangere, Liù" – "Do not cry, Liù"). The three ministers, Timur, and Liù then try one last time to stop the Prince ("Ah! Per l'ultima volta!" – "Ah! For the last time!") from attempting to answer the riddles, but he refuses to heed their advice.

He calls Turandot's name three times, and each time Liù, Timur, and the ministers reply, "Death!" and the crowd declares, "We're already digging your grave!" Rushing to the gong that hangs in front of the palace, the Prince strikes it three times, declaring himself to be a suitor. From the palace balcony, Turandot accepts his challenge, as Ping, Pang, and Pong laugh at the Prince's foolishness.

=== Act 2 ===
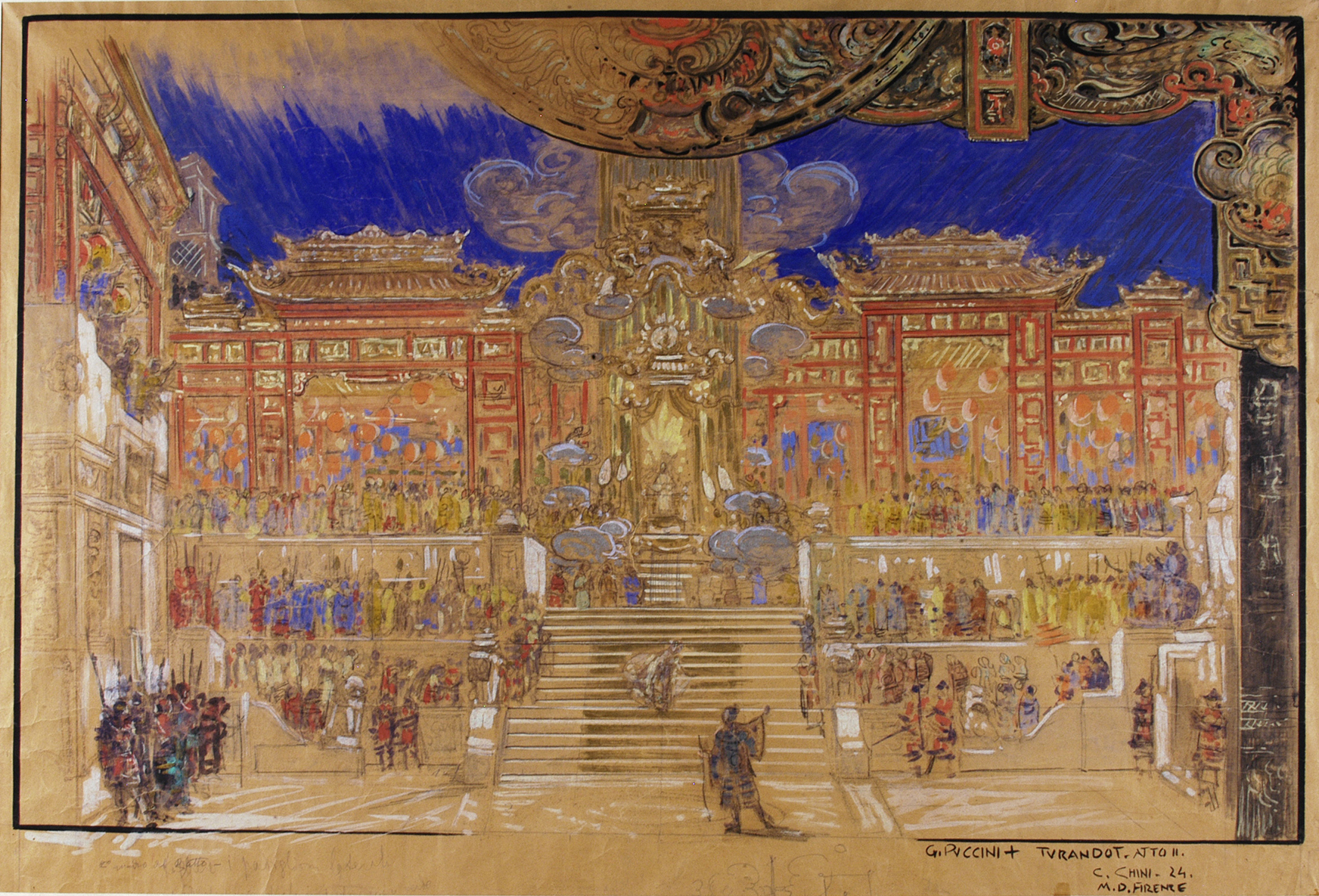
Il vasto piazzale della Reggia, set design for Turandot, act 2, scene 2 (1924)

Scene 1: A pavilion in the imperial palace. Before sunrise

Ping, Pang, and Pong lament their place as ministers, poring over palace documents and presiding over endless rituals. They prepare themselves for either a wedding or a funeral (Trio – Ping, Pang, Pong: "Ola, Pang!"). Ping suddenly longs for his country house in Honan, with its small lake surrounded by bamboo. Pong remembers his grove of forests near Tsiang, and Pang recalls his gardens near Kiu. The three share their fond memories of their lives away from the palace (Trio – Ping, Pang, Pong: "Ho una casa nell'Honan" – "I have a house in Honan"). They turn their thoughts back to how they have been accompanying young princes to their deaths. As the palace trumpet sounds, the ministers ready themselves for another spectacle as they await the entrance of their Emperor.

Scene 2: The courtyard of the palace. Sunrise

"In questa reggia", Bianca Scacciati and Francesco Merli

The Emperor Altoum, father of Turandot, sits on his grand throne in his palace. Weary of having to judge his isolated daughter's sport, he urges the Prince to withdraw his challenge, but the Prince refuses (Aria – Altoum, the Prince: "Un giuramento atroce" – "An atrocious oath"). Turandot enters and explains ("In questa reggia" – "In this palace") that her ancestress of millennia past, Princess Lo-u-Ling, reigned over her kingdom "in silence and joy, resisting the harsh domination of men" until she was raped and murdered by an invading foreign prince. Turandot claims that Lo-u-Ling now lives in her and, out of revenge, Turandot has sworn never to let any man wed her. She warns the Prince to withdraw but again he refuses. The Princess presents her first riddle: "Straniero, ascolta!" – "What is born each night and dies each dawn?" The Prince correctly replies, Speranza – "Hope". The Princess, unnerved, presents her second riddle ("Guizza al pari di fiamma" – "What flickers red and warm like a flame, but is not fire?") The Prince thinks for a moment before replying, Sangue – "Blood". Turandot is shaken. The crowd cheers the Prince, provoking Turandot's anger. She presents her third riddle ("Gelo che ti da foco" – "What is ice which gives you fire and which your fire freezes still more?"). He proclaims, "It is Turandot! Turandot!"

The crowd cheers for the triumphant Prince. Turandot throws herself at her father's feet and pleads with him not to leave her to the Prince's mercy. The Emperor insists that an oath is sacred and that it is Turandot's duty to wed the Prince (Duet – Turandot, Altoum, the Prince: "Figlio del cielo"). She cries out in despair, "Will you take me by force? (Mi porterai con la forza?) The Prince stops her, saying that he has a riddle for her: "You do not know my name. Tell me my name before sunrise, and at dawn, I will die." Turandot accepts. The Emperor then declares that he hopes that he will be able to call the Prince his son when the sun next rises.

=== Act 3 ===
Scene 1: The palace gardens. Night

In the distance, heralds call out Turandot's command: "Cosi comanda Turandot" – "This night, none shall sleep in Peking! The penalty for all will be death if the Prince's name is not discovered by morning." The Prince waits for dawn and anticipates his victory: "Nessun dorma" – "Let no one sleep!"

Ping, Pong, and Pang appear and offer the Prince women and riches if he will only give up Turandot ("Tu che guardi le stelle"), but he refuses. A group of soldiers then drag in Timur and Liù. They have been seen speaking to the Prince, so they must know his name. Turandot enters and orders Timur and Liù to speak. The Prince feigns ignorance, saying they know nothing. But when the guards begin to treat Timur harshly, Liù declares that she alone knows the Prince's name, but she will not reveal it.

Ping demands the Prince's name, and when Liù refuses to say it, she is tortured. Turandot is clearly taken aback by Liù's resolve and asks Liù who or what gave her such a strong resolve. Liù answers, "Princess, love!" ("Principessa, amore!"). Turandot demands that Ping tear the Prince's name from Liù, and Ping orders Liù to be tortured even more. Liù counters Turandot ("Tu che di gel sei cinta" – "You who are encircled by ice"), saying that Turandot too will learn the exquisite joy of being guided by caring and compassionate love. (Note: The words of that aria were actually written by Puccini. Waiting for Adami and Simoni to deliver the next part of the libretto, he wrote the words and when they read them, they decided that they could not improve them.) Having spoken, Liù seizes a dagger from a soldier's belt and stabs herself. As she staggers towards the Prince and falls dead, the crowd screams for her to speak the Prince's name. Since Timur is blind, he must be told about Liù's death, and he cries out in anguish.

When Timur warns that the gods will be offended by Liù's death, the crowd becomes subdued, very afraid and ashamed. The grieving Timur and the crowd follow Liù's body as it is carried away. Everybody departs, leaving the Prince and Turandot alone. He reproaches Turandot for her cruelty (Duet – The Prince, Turandot: "Principessa di morte" – "Princess of death"), then takes her in his arms and kisses her in spite of her resistance. (Note: Here Puccini's work ends. The remainder of the music for the premiere was completed by Franco Alfano.)

The Prince tries to persuade Turandot to love him. At first, she feels disgusted, but after he kisses her, she feels herself becoming more ardently desiring to be held and compassionately loved by him. She admits that ever since she met the Prince, she realised she both hated and loved him. She tells him to ask for nothing more and to leave, taking his mystery with him. The Prince, however, then reveals his name: "Calaf, son of Timur – Calaf, figlio di Timur", thereby placing his life in Turandot's hands. She can now destroy him if she wants (Duet – Turandot, Calaf: "Del primo pianto").

Scene 2: The courtyard of the palace. Dawn

Turandot and Calaf approach the Emperor's throne. She declares that she knows the Prince's name: ("Diecimila anni al nostro Imperatore!") – "It is ... love!" The crowd sings and acclaims the two lovers ("O sole! Vita! Eternità").

== Critical response ==
While long recognised as the most tonally adventurous of Puccini's operas, Turandot has also been considered a flawed masterpiece, and some critics have been hostile toward it. Joseph Kerman states that "Nobody would deny that dramatic potential can be found in this tale. Puccini, however, did not find it; his music does nothing to rationalise the legend or illuminate the characters." Kerman also wrote that while Turandot is more "suave" musically than Puccini's earlier opera, Tosca, "dramatically it is a good deal more depraved."

Some of this criticism is possibly due to the standard Alfano ending (Alfano II), in which Liù's death is followed almost immediately by Calaf's "rough wooing" of Turandot, and the "bombastic" end to the opera. A later attempt at completing the opera was made, with the co-operation of the publishers, Ricordi, in 2002 by Luciano Berio. The Berio version is considered to overcome some of these criticisms, but critics such as Michael Tanner have failed to be wholly convinced by the new ending, noting that the criticism by the Puccini advocate Julian Budden still applies: "Nothing in the text of the final duet suggests that Calaf's love for Turandot amounts to anything more than a physical obsession: nor can the ingenuities of Simoni and Adami's text for 'Del primo pianto' convince us that the Princess's submission is any less hormonal."

Ashbrook and Powers consider it was an awareness of this problem – an inadequate buildup for Turandot's change of heart, combined with an overly successful treatment of the secondary character (Liù) – which contributed to Puccini's inability to complete the opera. Another alternative ending, written by Chinese composer Hao Weiya, has Calaf pursue Turandot but kiss her tenderly, not forcefully; and the lines beginning "Del primo pianto" (Of the first tears) are expanded into an aria where Turandot tells Calaf more fully about her change of heart.

Concerning the compelling believability of the self-sacrificial Liù character in contrast to the two mythic protagonists, biographers note echoes in Puccini's own life. He had had a servant named Doria, whom his wife accused of sexual relations with Puccini. The accusations escalated until Doria killed herself. In Turandot, Puccini lavished his attention on the familiar sufferings of Liù, as he had on his many previous suffering heroines. However, in the opinion of Father Owen Lee, Puccini was out of his element when it came to resolving the tale of his two allegorical protagonists. Finding himself completely outside his normal genre of verismo, he was incapable of completely grasping and resolving the necessary elements of the mythic, unable to "feel his way into the new, forbidding areas the myth opened up to him" – and thus unable to finish the opera in the two years before his unexpected death.

== Instrumentation ==
Turandot is scored for three flutes (the third doubling piccolo); two oboes; one cor anglais; two clarinets in B♭; one bass clarinet in B♭, two bassoons; one contrabassoon; two onstage alto saxophones in E♭; four French horns in F; three trumpets in F; three tenor trombones; one contrabass trombone; six onstage trumpets in B♭, three onstage trombones; and one onstage bass trombone; a percussion section with timpani, cymbals, gong, one triangle, one snare drum, one bass drum, one tam-tam, one glockenspiel, one xylophone, one bass xylophone, tubular bells, and tuned Chinese gongs; one onstage wood block; one onstage large gong; one celesta; one pipe organ; two harps; and strings.
