= Franco Lo Giudice =

Italian opera singer

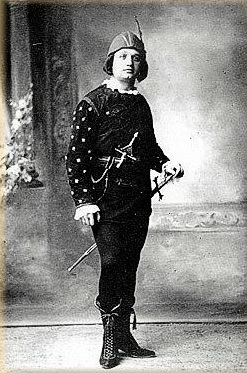
Franco Lo Giudice

Franco Lo Giudice (14 March 1893 – 8 August 1990) was an Italian tenor who had a successful international opera career during the first half of the 20th century. He was an important exponent of the works of Riccardo Zandonai, notably starring in the world premieres of his operas I cavalieri di Ekebù (1925) and Giuliano (1928). His voice is preserved on a number of recordings made with the His Master's Voice, Parlophone, and Pathé record labels. Music critic Alan Blyth described him as having “a fiery, strong tenor, but tends to use it too tearfully”

== Early life and education ==
Born in Paternò, Lo Giudice was the older brother of tenor Silvio Costa Lo Giudice and a distant cousin of Portuguese soprano Maria Giudice. He studied singing with Beniamino Carelli at the Conservatory of San Pietro a Majella in Naples, Matteo Adernò in Catania, and with Antonio Savastano, Luigi Lucenti, and Luigi Di Cagno in Milan. His studies were interrupted in 1914 when he was drafted into the Italian Army following the outbreak of World War I. His first public performances were given during the war, singing in concerts for Italian soldiers. He served in the military for the duration of the war, and then continued with further opera studies at its conclusion in 1918.

== Career ==
Lo Giudice made his operatic debut in 1919 as Gastone in La traviata at the opera house in Livorno. In 1920, he sang Dick Johnson in Giacomo Puccini's La fanciulla del West at the opera house in Tortona. In 1922, he made his first appearance at the Teatro di San Carlo as Prince Vasiliy Ivanovich Shuysky in the Naples premiere of Boris Godunov with Sigismondo Zalewsky in the title role. That same year, he had a major triumph at the Teatro Costanzi in Rome singing the title role in Umberto Giordano's Andrea Chénier. He made a number of appearances at the Anfiteatro Gangi in Catania in 1922-1923, including Edgardo in Lucia di Lammermoor, Gastone, and Turiddu in Cavalleria rusticana. In 1924, he made his debut at the Teatro Regio in Turin as Romeo in Riccardo Zandonai's Giulietta e Romeo opposite Hina Spani as Giulietta. He returned to that house several times through 1935, singing such roles as Giannetto Malaspini in La cena delle beffe and Pollione in Norma, among others.

On 7 March 1925, Lo Giudice made his debut at La Scala as Giosta Berling in the world premiere of Zandonai's I cavalieri di Ekebù under the baton of Arturo Toscanini. Toscanini was quite taken with his performance, and Lo Giudice was contracted by him frequently for performances at La Scala through the mid-1930s. In 1926, he alternated in the role of Prince Calàf with tenor Miguel Fleta in the original production of Puccini's Turandot, although Fleta had the honour of singing the part for the opera's opening night. Other roles he portrayed at La Scala included Avito in L'amore dei tre re, Dick Johnson, Giannetto Malaspini, and Giuseppe Hagenbach in La Wally, among others.

Lo Giudice made his first appearance at the Teatro Comunale di Bologna on 21 November 1925 as Giannetto Malaspini to Carmen Melis's Ginerva and Salvatore Baccaloni's Tornaquinci. He returned to that house in 1927 to portray Mateo in Zandonai's Conchita and again in 1928 to sing Dick Johnson to Iva Pacetti's Minnie. In 1926, he made his debut at the Arena di Verona Festival and in 1927 he sang Prince Calàf to Elena Barrigar's Turandot for his first appearance at the Teatro Regio in Parma. He returned to Parma in 1930 to sing Calàf to Patrizia Toldi's Turandot and again in 1938 to portray Eugenio Beauharnais in Italo Brancucci's Fiorella.

Lo Giudice returned to the Teatro di San Carlo in 1927 to sing the title role in Arrigo Boito's Nerone with Elena Barrigar as Asteria. He sang again at that house on 4 February 1928 when he portrayed the title role in the world premiere of Zandonai's Giuliano. The following 14 March, he made his first appearance at the Teatro dell'Opera di Roma singing the title role in the world premiere of Giuseppe Mulè's Dafni. He sang several roles at the Rome opera house through 1930, including Giuliano and Calàf. He also made his first appearance at the Teatro Donizetti in Bergamo in 1928 as Des Grieux in Puccini's Manon Lescaut.

On the international stage, Lo Giudice performed in opera houses in Hungary, Brazil, and Chile during the 1920s and early 1930s. In 1925, he performed at the Royal Opera, London as Pinkerton in Madama Butterfly. He remained active in Italian opera houses up into the mid-1940s. One of his last performances was a portrayal of Andrea Chénier at the Teatro Verdi in Florence in 1944 with Iris Ferriani as Maddalena. After retiring from the stage, he taught singing at the Istituto Musicale Vincenzo Bellini in Catania. He died in Catania at the age of 97.

== Sources ==
- Opera, Volume 42 by George Henry Hubert Lascelles Harewood, page 44
- Opera on record 3 by Alan Blyth, page 124
- Il tenore Franco Lo Giudice: nel centenario della nascita di Riccardo Zandonai by Bruno Cagnoli and Salvatore D. Randazzo
