= Ercole Luigi Morselli =

Italian writer and dramatist (1882–1921)

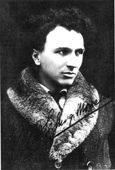
Ercole Luigi Morselli

Ercole Luigi Morselli (Pesaro, 19 February 1882 – Rome, 16 March 1921) was an Italian writer and dramatist.

In Florence, where his family moved in 1891 following his father, a state counsel who died there in 1895, Morselli attempted to study medicine and literature, but in both cases he did not succeed and had to interrupt his studies. In the following years he had a very turbulent life, with many journeys first in Africa and Latin America, then also in England and France. Morselli was a friend of Giovanni Papini and Giuseppe Prezzolini. After his return to Italy, Morselli started his literary career, which was initially quite difficult, such that his mother had to support him for long time. In 1910 his tragicomedy Orione obtained a great success, but Morselli did not reach economic stability until 1919, with the success of Glauco, a drama given in Rome. Morselli was also film director and screenplayer. He died of tuberculosis in a Roman hospital in 1921.

The works of Morselli are based on the classical myths, revisited from a modern viewpoint. His most successful works are Orione, a tragicomedy where the main character is a demigod with very unspiritual desires, and Glauco, which describes the story of a fisher who becomes god of the sea but discovers that power does not necessarily bring joy. Morselli, portraying antiheroes, represented an alternative to the spirit of D'Annunzio. With his short story La donna ragno (The spider woman, 1915), Morselli was in addition one of the precursors of the science fiction in Italy. His play Belfagor was used by Claudio Guastalla as subject for the libretto of the opera with the same title (1926) of Ottorino Respighi.

== Works ==
=== Plays ===
- Orione, tragicomedy in 3 acts, Teatro Argentina, Rome, 17 March 1910
- Acqua sul fuoco (Water upon fire), comedy in 1 act, Teatro Metastasio, Rome, 31 March 1910
- Il domatore Gastone (Gastone the Tamer), comedy in 1 act, Rome, 1911
- La prigione (The prison), drama in 3 acts, Teatro Carignano, Turin, November 1911
- Glauco, Teatro Argentina, Rome, 30 May 1919
- Belfagor, "arcidiavoleria" ("archdevilment") in 4 acts, Teatro Valle, Rome, 19 April 1933 (posthumous première)

=== Short stories ===
- Favole per i re d’oggi (Fables for the kings of today), Rome, 1909
- Storie da ridere… e da piangere (Stories to laugh... and to cry), Milan, 1918. Eight short stories, including La donna ragno.
- Il «Trio Stefania», Milan 1919
- Favole e fantasie (Tales and fantasies), Milan, 1928 (posthumous edition)
- L’Osteria degli scampoli ed altri racconti (The inn of the cripples and other stories), Milan, 1936 (posthumous edition)

=== Films ===
- Effetti di luce (Light effects), 1916, directed with Ugo Falena
