= La campana sommersa =

Opera by Ottorino Respighi

- Opera by Ottorino Respighi
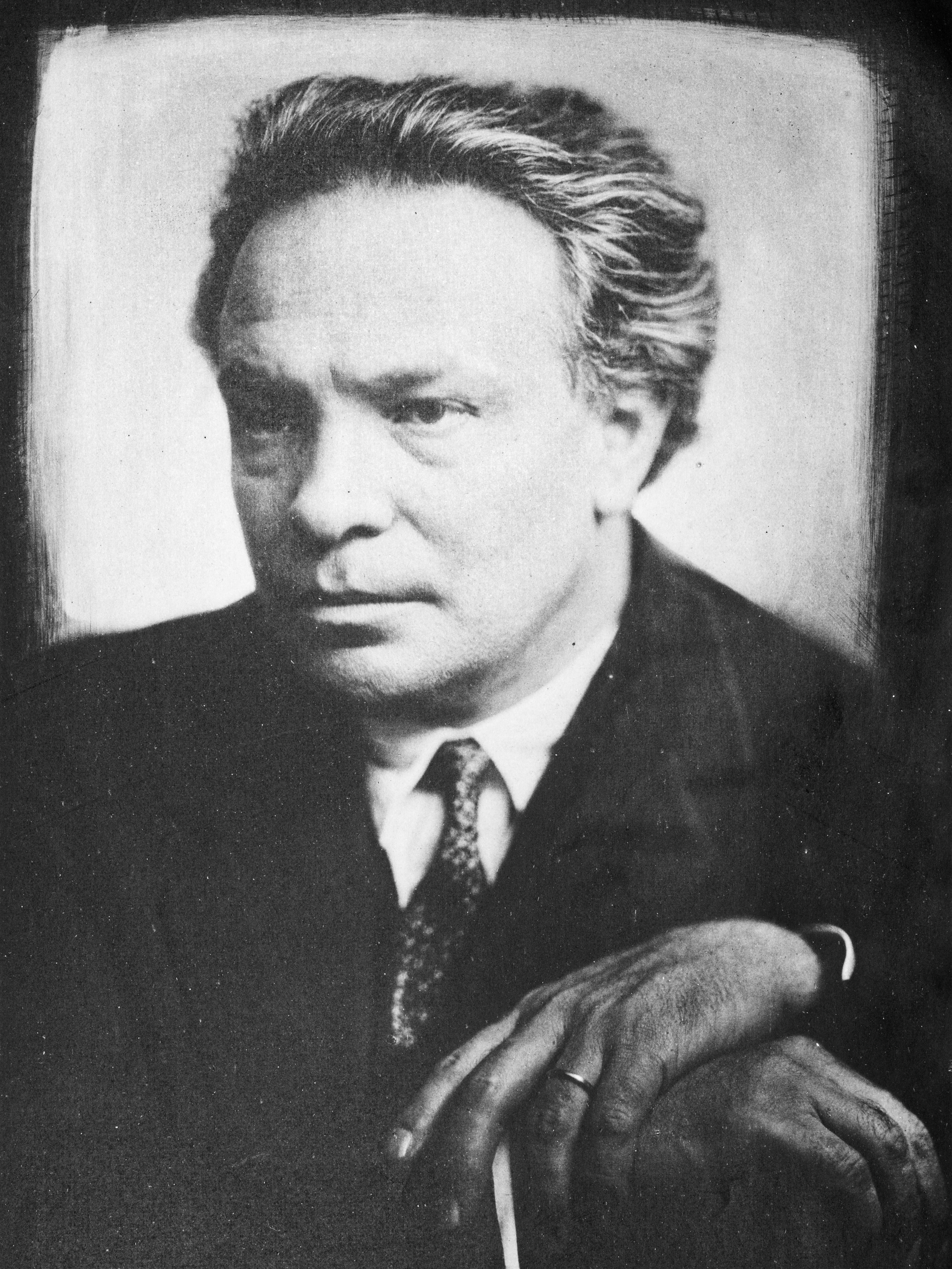
- Respighi in 1927
- Librettist: Claudio Guastalla
- Language: Italian
- Based on: Die versunkene Glocke by Hauptmann
- Premiere: 27 November 1927; Stadttheater Hamburg

La campana sommersa (The Sunken Bell) is an opera in four acts by Italian composer Ottorino Respighi. Its libretto is by Claudio Guastalla, based on the play Die versunkene Glocke by German author Gerhart Hauptmann. The opera's premiere was on 18 November 1927 in Hamburg, Germany. Respighi's regular publisher, Ricordi, was displeased by his choice of subject, and refused to publish the opera. This led to its being published by the German publisher Bote & Bock, and a German premiere.

The fairy-tale world of Hauptmann's play inspired Respighi to create his most lavishly and imaginatively orchestrated operatic score, which frequently reminds the listener of his famous symphonic poems. Since the opera's anti-hero Enrico is a bell maker, Respighi fills the music with many chiming and ringing effects.

== Roles ==
Roles, voice types, premiere cast
Role	Voice type	Premiere cast, 18 November 1927 Conductor: Werner Wolff
Rautendelein, an elf girl	soprano	Gertrud Callam
Ondino, a water spirit	baritone	Josef Degler
A faun	tenor	Paul Schwartz
Enrico, a bell maker	tenor	Gunnar Graarud
An old witch, Rautendelein's grandmother	soprano	Sabine Kalter
A priest	bass	Rudolf Bockelmann
A schoolmaster	baritone	Herbert Taubert
A barber	baritone	Karl Waschmann
Magda, Enrico's wife	soprano	Emmy Land (Note: Emmy Land was the wife of Werner Wolff, the conductor)
The spectres of Enrico's two children	speaking roles	

== Instrumentation ==
La campana sommersa is scored for the following instruments:

3 flutes (3 doubling on piccolo), 2 oboes, English horn, 2 clarinets, bass clarinet, 2 bassoons, 4 horns, 3 trumpets, 2 tenor trombones, bass trombone, bass tuba, timpani, bass drum, handbells, cymbals, tam-tam, triangle, Basque drum, xylophone, anvils and drum sticks, harp, celesta, organ, bell, strings.

== Synopsis ==
=== Act 1 ===
Enrico, a bell maker, has built a bell for a new church, but the Faun has thrown it to the bottom of a lake. Enrico falls into despair. Overwhelmed with compassion, Rautendelein, an elf, decides to enter the human world. The water spirit Ondino tries in vain to dissuade her.

=== Act 2 ===
Enrico is overwhelmed by the misfortune, and his wife Magda worries that he would never work again. Rautendelein, in the form of a little girl believed to be dumb, is introduced to the family by a priest to help Magda. Her presence manages to magically bring back Enrico's strength and vigor.

=== Act 3 ===
Enrico and Rautendelein fall in love. Enrico abandons Magda, and even intends to found a new religion, for which he is designing a temple. In vain the priest tries to dissuade him: "It is easier that the bell submerged at the bottom of the lake rings", replies Enrico. Magda, distraught, kills herself by jumping into the lake. As his children announce the tragedy, the tolling of the bell from underwater is heard. Enrico, horrified, abandons Rautendelein.

=== Act 4 ===
Rautendelein has now become the wife of Ondino. Enrico, close to death, meets a witch who grants his wish to see Rautendelein for a final time. She appears to him "as white as the Angel of Death". At first, she pretends not to recognize him, then answering to his pleas, kisses him gently as he dies.

== Recordings ==
Year	Cast (Rautendelein, Magda, Enrico, Fauno)	Conductor, opera house and orchestra	Label
1956	Margherita Carosio, Rina Malatrasi, Umberto Borsò, Tommaso Frascati	Franco Capuana, Orchestra e Coro della RAI di Milano	CD: Great Opera Performances
2003	Laura Aikin, Alessandra Rezza, John Daszak, Kevin Connors	Friedemann Layer, Opéra et Orchestre National de Montpellier Languedoc-Roussillon	CD: Accord; Cat: 4761884
2018	Valentina Farcas, Maria Luigia Borsi, Angelo Villari, Filippo Adami	Donato Renzetti, Cagliari Teatro Lirico Chorus and Coro del Conservatorio Giovanni Pierluigi da Palestrina di Cagliari Cagliari Teatro Lirico Orchestra	Blu-ray and DVD: Naxos Catalogue No: 2.110571 Barcode: 747313557158
