= Claudio Guastalla =

Italian opera librettist

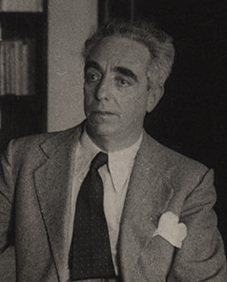
Claudio Guastalla in 1932

Claudio Guastalla was an Italian opera librettist.

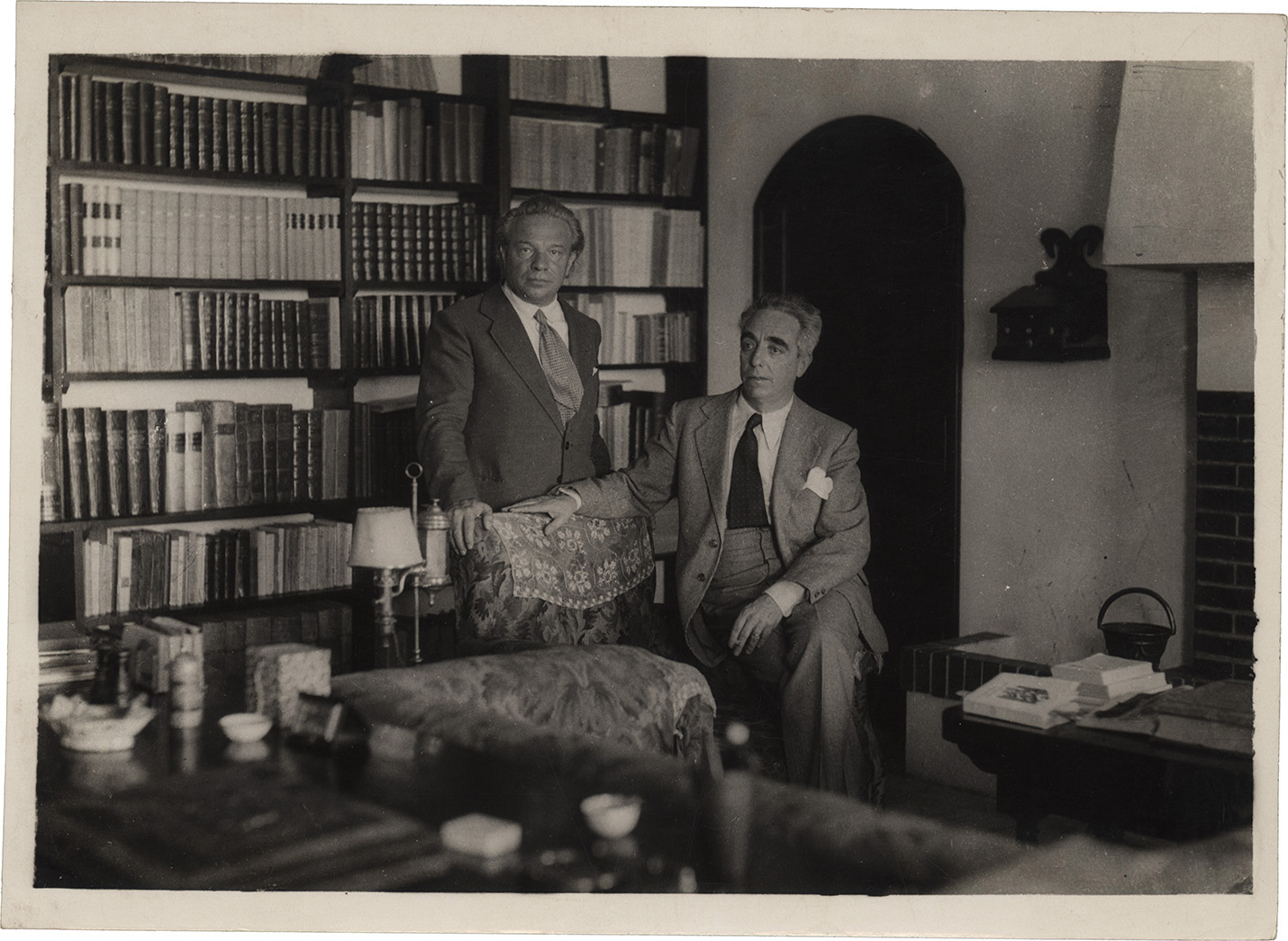
Claudio Guastalla (right) with Ottorino Respighi in 1932 in Rome

Guastalla was born in Rome on 7 November 1880 and died probably in the same city in 1948.

Especially important was his collaboration with the composer Ottorino Respighi.

== Operas ==
Guastalla wrote fifteen libretti. Among them:

- La grazia, opera in 2 acts, music by Vincenzo Michetti, Rome, Teatro Costanzi, 31 March 1923 (after Grazia Deledda)
- Belfagor, commedia lirica in 1 prologue, 2 acts and 1 epilogue, music by Ottorino Respighi, Milan, Teatro alla Scala, 26 April 1923
- Die versunkene Glocke (La campana sommersa), opera in 4 acts, music by Ottorino Respighi, Hamburg, Stadttheater, 18 November 1927
- Odette, opera in 3 acts, music by Mario Marangolo, Brescia, Teatro Grande, 1929
- Maria egiziaca, mistero lirico in 1 act and three episodes, music by Ottorino Respighi, New York City, Carnegie Hall, 16 March 1932
- La fiamma, melodramma in 3 acts, music by Ottorino Respighi, Rome, Teatro dell'Opera, 23 January 1934
- Lucrezia, opera in 1 act, music by Ottorino Respighi, Milan, Teatro alla Scala, 24 February 1937
- Gli Orazi, opera (istoria per musica) in 1 act, music by Ennio Porrino, Milan, Teatro alla Scala, 1 February 1941

Guastalla was also the author of the subject of Respighi's ballet Belkis, regina di Saba (1932) and collaborated with Respighi for a revision (1934) of the libretto of L'Orfeo of Claudio Monteverdi.
