= Renato Simoni =

Italian journalist, playwright, writer and critic

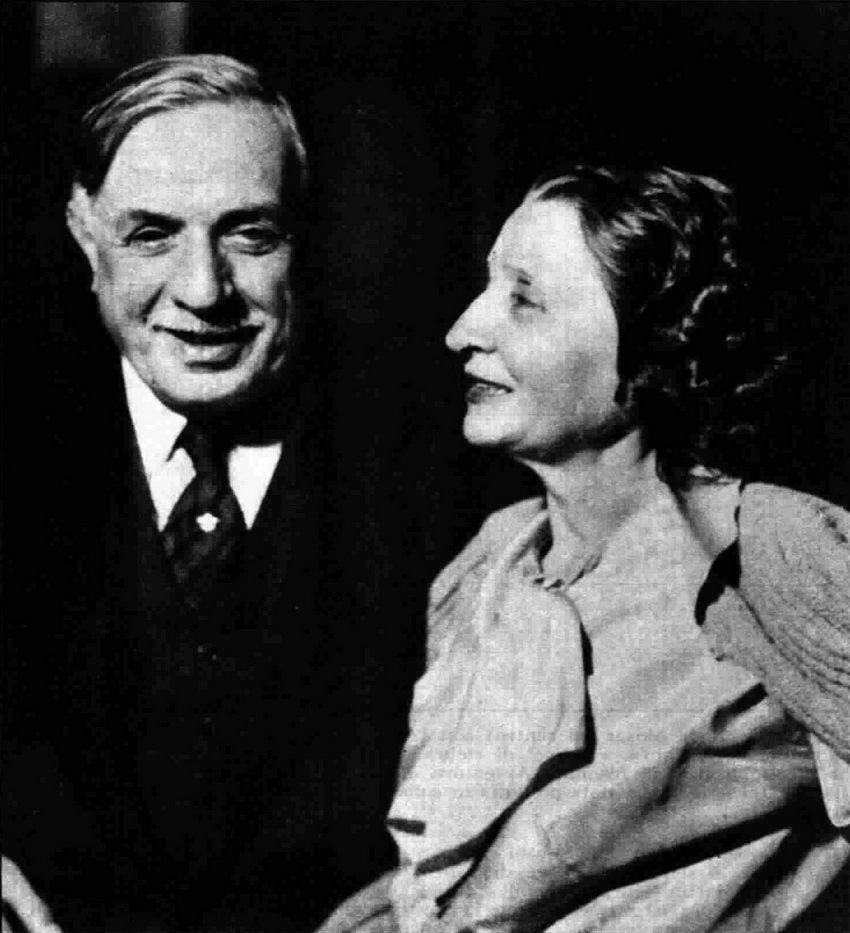
Renato Simoni and Emma Gramatica, 1930 ca.

Renato Simoni (Verona, 5 September 1875 – Milan, 5 July 1952) was an Italian journalist, playwright, writer and theatrical critic noted for his collaboration work with Giuseppe Adami for Giacomo Puccini's Turandot.

== Biography ==
Renato Simoni was born in Verona. In 1879 he lost his father and became the sole provider for his family, taking care of his mother and sister. For several years he worked as a private teacher giving Latin lessons, but often the family had to go to the monastery kitchen where monks gave some food to they poor.

At the age of 19, he made his first steps as a journalist. Simoni's career was entirely devoted to theater. His first job was as an editor and a critic at Veronese newspaper L'Adige, then also at L'Arena. In 1899, he moved to Milan. In 1902, he wrote one of his best comedies, La Vedova, followed by Carlo Gozzi (1903), Tramondo (1906), Congedo (1910) and Il matrimonio di Casanova.

In 1914, he succeeded John Pozza as an author and critic at Corriere della Sera newspaper. He worked for the company until the end of his life. He also held a position as a director for a weekly magazine, La Tradotta.

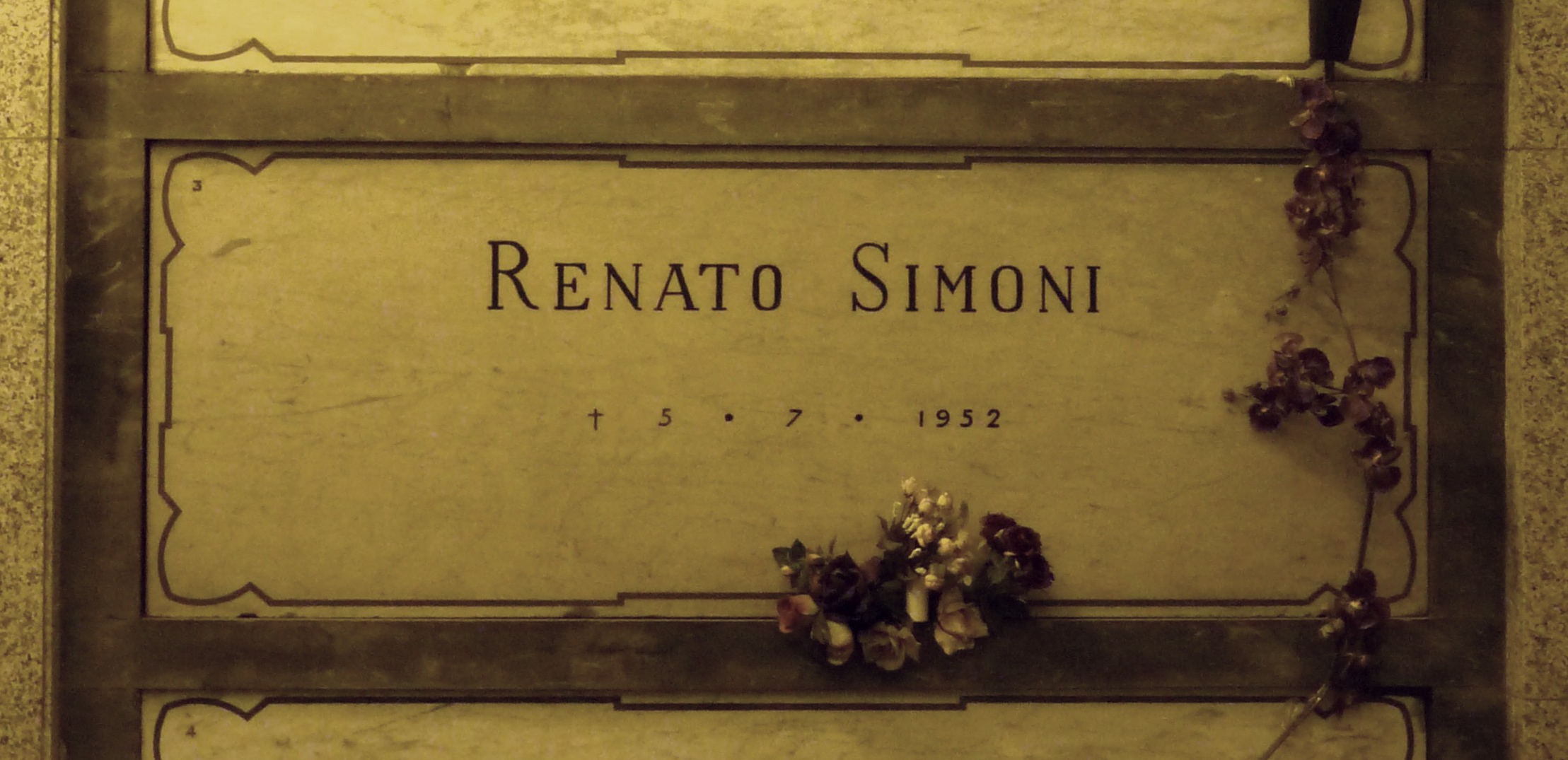
Simoni's grave at the Monumental Cemetery of Milan, Italy

All his writings and critics were collected in volumes by Lucio Ridenti in 1951 under the title Trent'anni di cronaca drammatica and was published in 1960.

In 1952, Simoni donated 40,000 volumes of his writings and reviews to the Museum of La Scala and dedicated them to his mother, Livia. The museum library was named Biblioteca Livia Simoni after his mother.

Simoni died in Milan in 1952 and is buried at the city's Monumental Cemetery.

In 1958, an award Premio "Renato Simoni" was established in Verona. The ceremony is held every year on July the 5th, this prize is given to those who dedicated most of their lives to drama theater.

== Sources ==
- Simonelli, Luciano (2013). RENATO SIMONI: Ciò che importa è vivere da galantuomo. Simonelli Editore. ISBN 978-88-7647-956-4.
