= Vincenzo Michetti =

Italian composer

Vincenzo Michetti (1878 in Pesaro – 1956 in Pesaro) was an Italian composer.

== Works ==
=== Operas ===
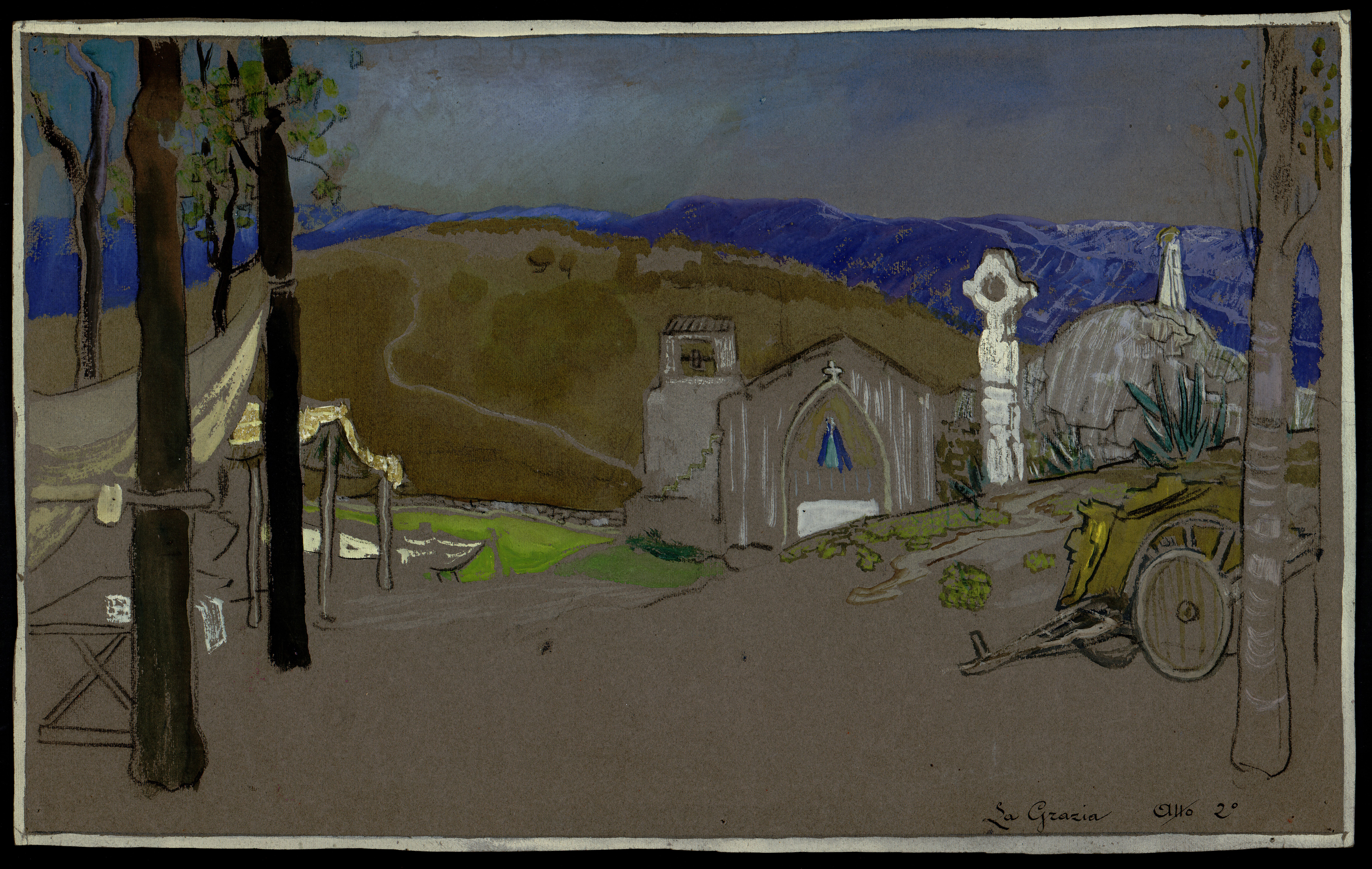
Una china rocciosa che digrada dolcemente, set design for Grazia act 2 (1923).

- Maria di Magdala, dramma lirico in 3 acts (episodes), libretto by the composer, Rome, Teatro Costanzi, 5 March 1918
- La grazia, dramma pastorale in 3 acts, libretto by Claudio Guastalla after Grazia Deledda, Rome, Teatro Costanzi, 31 March 1923 The first performance obtained a good success.
- La Maddalena, opera in 3 acts, libretto by the composer, Milan, Teatro alla Scala, 22 November 1928 La Maddalena was a revision of Maria di Magdala with a different plot and many updates in the music. The reception was not fully satisfactory, due to persistent musical imperfections.

=== Other ===
Michetti was also the author of songs and music for piano.
