= Giorgio Lamberti (tenor) =

Italian opera singer

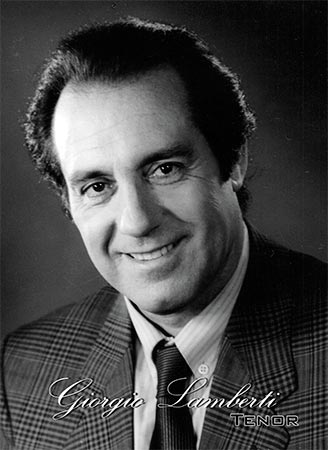
Giorgio Lamberti

Giorgio Lamberti (born 9 July 1938) is an Italian operatic tenor. He made his professional debut at the Teatro dell'Opera di Roma in 1964 as Henri in Les vêpres siciliennes. He returned to that theatre the following year to star in the world premiere of Mario Zafred’s Wallenstein. In 1965, he made his American debut at the Lyric Opera of Chicago as Radames in Giuseppe Verdi's Aida. In 1974, he made his debut at the Metropolitan Opera as Cavaradossi in Tosca, and in 1979 he gave his first performance at the Royal Opera House, Covent Garden in the title role of Don Carlos. He has sung leading roles internationally at such theatres as La Scala, the Berlin State Opera, the Vienna State Opera, the Paris Opera, the Teatro Colón and the Zürich Opera, among others.
