= Giacomo Lauri-Volpi =

Italian opera singer

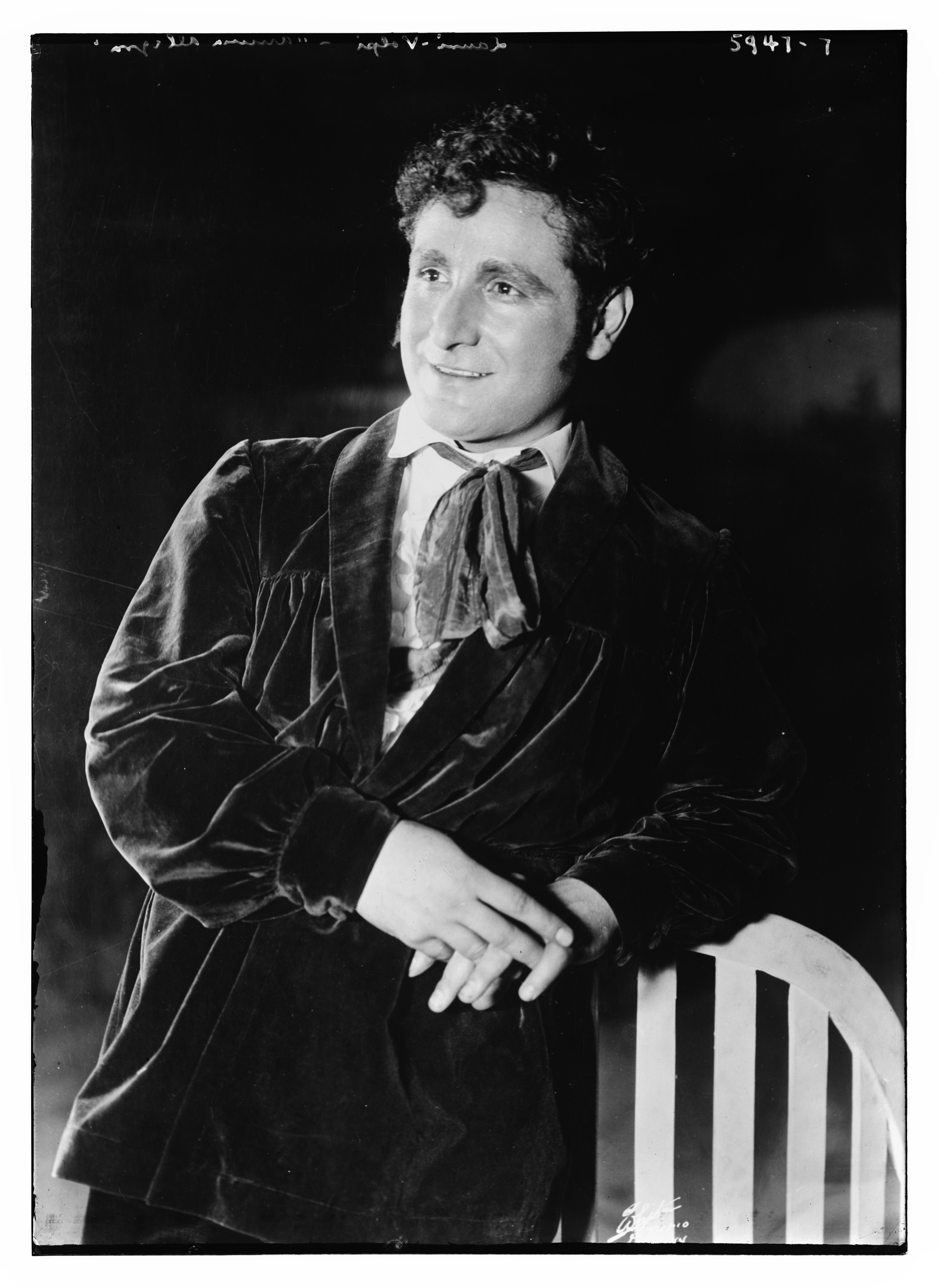
Giacomo Lauri-Volpi in the role of Pedro in Franco Vittadini's opera Anima allegra, 1923

Giacomo Lauri-Volpi (11 December 1892 – 17 March 1979) was an Italian tenor with a lyric voice of exceptional range and technical facility. He performed throughout Europe and the Americas in a top-class career that spanned 40 years.

== Career and assessment ==
Giacomo Lauri Volpi (photo with dedication)

Giacomo Lauri Volpi as the Duke of Mantua in Rigoletto, teatro alla Scala, 1946

Born in Lanuvio, Italy, he was orphaned at the age of 11. After completing his secondary education at the seminary at Albano and graduating from the University of Rome La Sapienza, he began vocal studies under the great 19th-century baritone Antonio Cotogni at the Liceo Musicale (later Conservatorio) Santa Cecilia in Rome.

His nascent singing career was put on hold, however, by the outbreak of World War I in 1914, during which he served with the Italian armed forces reaching the rank of captain and emerging as one of Italy's most decorated soldiers. The war over, he made a successful operatic debut as Arturo in Bellini's I Puritani in Viterbo, Italy, on 2 September 1919—performing under the name Giacomo Rubini, after Bellini's favourite tenor, Giovanni Battista Rubini. Four months later, on 3 January 1920, he scored another success, at the Teatro Costanzi in Rome, this time performing under his own name opposite Rosina Storchio and Ezio Pinza in Massenet's Manon.

Lauri-Volpi was widely acclaimed for his performances at Italy's most celebrated opera house, La Scala, Milan, between the two world wars. A highlight of his Milan seasons occurred in 1929 when he was chosen to sing Arnoldo in La Scala's centenary production of Rossini's Guglielmo Tell.

He was also a leading tenor at the New York Metropolitan Opera from 1923 to 1933, appearing there in a total of 307 performances. During this 10-year period he sang opposite Maria Jeritza in the American premiere of Puccini's Turandot and opposite Rosa Ponselle in the Met premiere of Verdi's Luisa Miller. His Met career was terminated prematurely after a dispute with the opera house's management. They wanted him to take a pay cut to help tide the theatre through the economic privations being caused by the Great Depression, but he refused to cooperate and left New York for Italy.

Lauri Volpi was much appreciated by audiences at the Teatro Colón in Buenos Aires. He sang there in 112 opera performances during 8 seasons between 1922 and 1939. He performed in 19 different operas. The roles he sang the most in Buenos Aires were Radamés in Aida, Manrico in Il Trovatore, and Rodolfo in La Bohéme. A highlight was singing Calaf in Turandot in June 1926 in the first performances of the opera outside Italy and barely two months after the world premiere, opposite Claudia Muzio as Turandot and Rosetta Pampanini as Liù, conducted by Gino Marinuzzi.

Lauri-Volpi's most notable appearances outside Italy also included two seasons at the Royal Opera House, Covent Garden—in 1925 and 1936. By the latter date, he had broadened his repertoire, progressing from lyric roles to more taxing dramatic parts. His voice began to show consequent signs of wear in the 1940s, losing homogeneity. His thrilling top notes remained remarkably intact, however, right through until the 1950s.

During the Second World War, Lauri-Volpi was based in Italy and was particularly admired by the country's dictator, Benito Mussolini. His last public performance in a full opera came in 1959, as Manrico, in a production of Verdi's Il Trovatore staged at Rome.

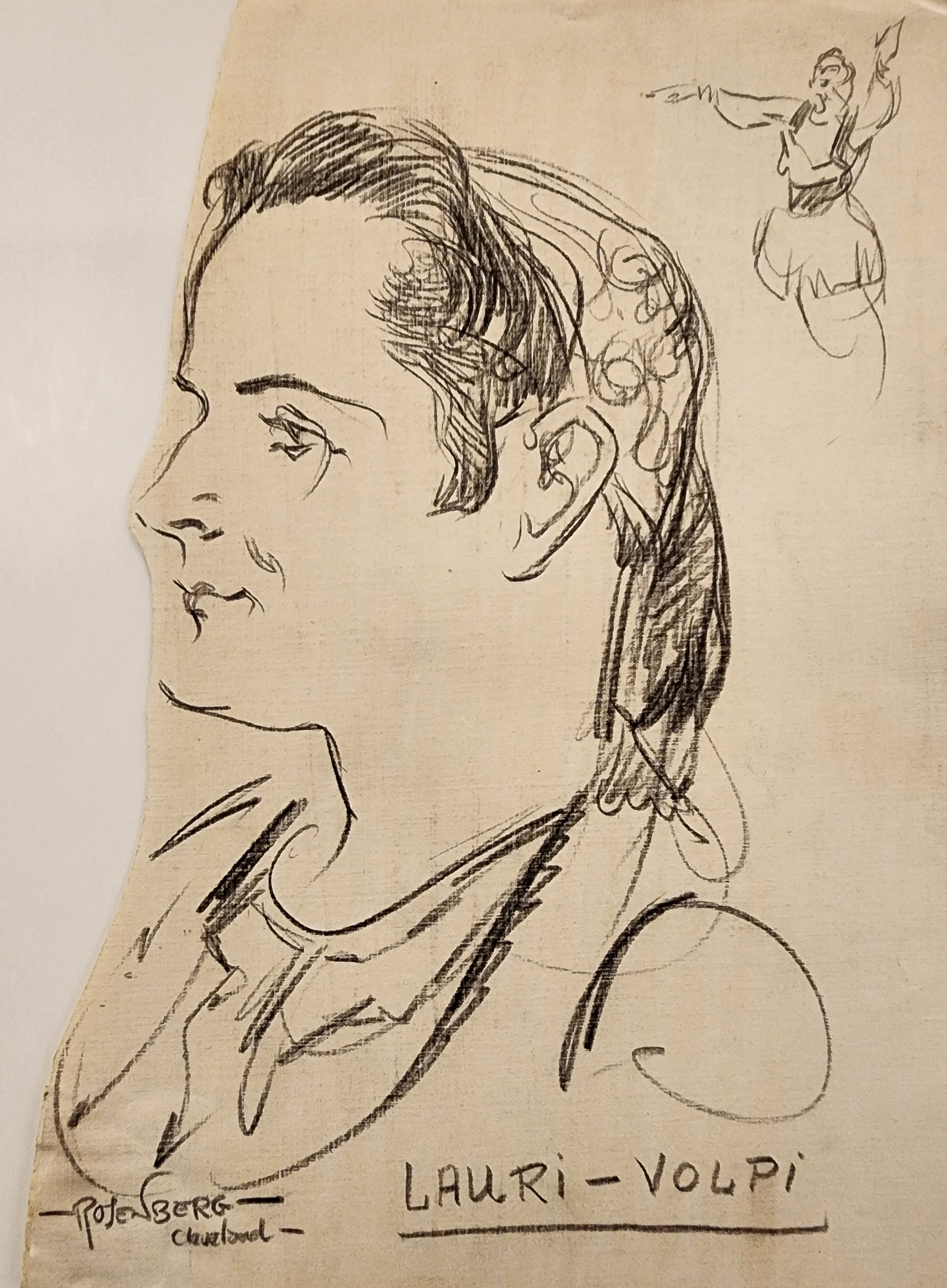
Signed drawing of Lauri-Volpi by Manuel Rosenberg for the Cincinnati Post 1924

Lauri-Volpi recorded a number of opera arias and duets for European and American gramophone companies during the height of his fame. His voice was an instrument at its zenith: bright, flexible and ringing in tone. He had easy and penetrating high notes and possessed a vibrato which made his voice instantly recognisable both on disc and in the theatre.

He sang roles as diverse as Arturo (in Bellini's I Puritani) and Otello (in Verdi's Otello). In the process, he cemented his position as one of the supreme opera singers of the 20th century, even though he faced stiff competition from a remarkable crop of rival Mediterranean tenors during his prime in the 1925-1940 period. (They included Beniamino Gigli, Giovanni Martinelli, Aureliano Pertile, Francesco Merli, Galliano Masini, Tito Schipa, Antonio Cortis and Renato Zanelli—as well as the young Alessandro Ziliani and Giovanni Malipiero.)

Lauri-Volpi was a cultured, intelligent man with a fiery temperament and firm opinions. He retired to Spain after World War II and died in Burjassot, near Valencia, at the age of 86.

== Recordings and writings ==
During the 1920s and 1930s, Lauri-Volpi made a number of 78-rpm recordings of operatic arias and duets for the following companies: Fonotipia, Brunswick, Victor and, finally, HMV. The discs that he cut for Victor and HMV are considered to be his finest. They are readily available on CD reissues. In 1947, he recorded in Italy a series of extended scenes from Rigoletto. Later, in the 1950s, he participated in the recording of some complete operas that do not capture his voice anywhere like its peak. They included:

- La bohème, Il trovatore and Luisa Miller (all made in 1951);
- Il trovatore and La favorita (both made in 1954, both live); and
- Gli Ugonotti (1955).

In addition, there is a live recording of Il trovatore from Naples in 1951, in which he is partnered by Maria Callas, under the baton of Tullio Serafin. All these recordings have been reissued on CD.

In 1974, aged 81, Lauri-Volpi released a final operatic recital record, but this particular LP has novelty value only. There are bits of newsreel footage of him performing on stage, too, and he appeared in the 1933 German film Das Lied der Sonne playing himself.

Lauri-Volpi wrote several books. The best known of them is Voci Parallele—a revealing study of singers and their vocal techniques that is frequently cited by historians. His main published works are:

- L'equivoco (Così è, e non vi pare) (Corbaccio, Milano, 1938);
- Cristalli viventi (Atlantica, Roma, 1948);
- A viso aperto, (Corbaccio, Milano, 1953);
- Voci parallele (Garzanti, Milano, 1955);
- Misteri della voce umana (Dall'Oglio, Roma, 1957); and
- Incontri e scontri (Bonavita, Roma, 1971);

Parallel Voices, an English translation of Voci Parallele, has been published by Bongiovanni, Bologna, in 2022.
