= Antonio Guarnieri =

Italian conductor and cellist (1880-1952)

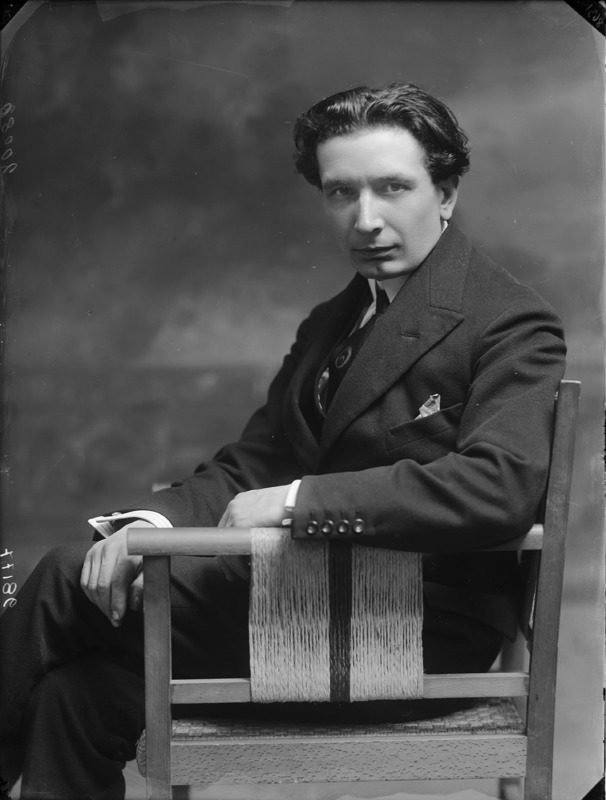
Antonio Guarnieri

Antonio Guarnieri (1 February 1880 in Venice, Italy — 25 November 1952 in Milan, Italy) was an Italian conductor and cellist.

After playing cello in the Martucci string quartet, he turned to conducting in 1904, being engaged by the Vienna Court Opera in 1912.

He succeeded Arturo Toscanini at La Scala in 1929 and stayed there until shortly before his death. A highly regarded technician at the podium, he conducted many important world premières, Ottorino Respighi's Belfagor, for instance.

It was hearing Guarnieri's conducting of Claude Debussy's Nocturnes that caused Claudio Abbado to resolve to become a conductor.

== Sources ==
- Harold Rosenthal and John Warrack: The Concise Oxford Dictionary of Opera. OXFORD UNIVERSITY PRESS, 1979
