= Miguel Fleta =

Spanish operatic tenor

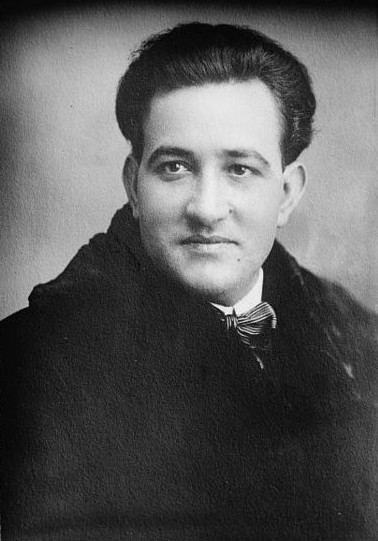
- Born: Miguel Burro Fleta; 28 December 1897; Albalate de Cinca, Spain
- Died: 29 May 1938 (aged 40); A Coruña, Spain
- Occupation: Opera singer (Lyric tenor)
- Years active: 1919–1935

Miguel Burro Fleta (28 December 1897, in Albalate de Cinca, Province of Huesca, Aragon – 29 May 1938, in A Coruña) was a Spanish operatic lyric tenor.

Despite his short stage career, lasting from 1919 to 1935, Fleta has been described as one of the most significant Iberian opera singers of the 20th century. Among the important international venues at which he sang were La Scala, Milan, (in 1923-26) and the New York Metropolitan Opera (in 1923-25). Additionally, in 1926, he had the honour of creating the role of Calaf in Puccini's posthumously-premiered final opera, Turandot, at the insistence of La Scala's principal conductor, Arturo Toscanini. But this taxing dramatic role took him to the limit of his resources and he did not attempt it again.

Fleta received his first musical training in the rondalla of his hometown and later studied at the Conservatori del Liceu in Barcelona, where he developed his repertoire under the guidance of the Belgian teacher Luisa Pierrick.

He made his operatic debut in Trieste in 1919, having previously studied voice at the Madrid conservatory. Successful engagements in Rome followed, leading to his La Scala and Met debuts. He quit the Met in acrimonious circumstances, however, and the resultant legal action stopped him performing again in the United States.

He was celebrated during his best years for the finesse with which he used his rich, flexible voice. The most notable aspect of his performance style was the nimbleness of his bel canto technique. This enabled him to produce spectacular messa di voce and pianissimo effects. Unfortunately, Fleta's singing became increasingly self-indulgent as his career progressed. By the late 1920s, as recordings show, his voice had deteriorated badly, with his vibrato loosening to an undesirable extent.

Fleta died in straitened circumstances in 1938. He nonetheless left a legacy of sometimes fascinating records, many of which are available on CD reissues.
