= Iva Pacetti =

Italian operatic soprano

Iva Pacetti in the 1930s (photo with 1942 dedication).

Iva Pacetti (13 December 1898, Prato - 19 January 1981, Milan) was an Italian operatic dramatic soprano who had an active international career from 1920 to 1947. Trained in Florence and Milan, she made her professional opera debut in her native city at the age of 21 as the title heroine in Giuseppe Verdi's Aida at the Teatro Metastasio. She reprised the role the following year at Loew's Lexington Theatre in New York City. In 1922 she had a triumphant success at the Teatro Carlo Felice as Elena in Arrigo Boito's Mefistofele. Engagements with other important opera houses soon followed, including La Scala, the Teatro Costanzi, the Teatro di San Carlo, the Opéra de Monte-Carlo, the Chicago Civic Opera, the Teatro Colón, the Teatro Municipal in Rio de Janeiro, and the Theatro Municipal in São Paulo. From 1930 to 1933 she was committed to the Royal Opera House in London, portraying such roles as Desdemona in Otello, Leonora in La forza del destino, and the title role in Tosca. The latter years of her career were spent performing primarily at La Scala where she was a frequent partner of Beniamino Gigli. She retired from the stage in 1947, after which she was active as a voice teacher in Milan.
