= Francesco Merli =

Italian opera singer

- Francesco Merli (photo with 1944 dedication)

Background information
- Born: 28 January 1887; Corsico, Lombardy, Italy
- Died: December 11, 1976 (aged 89) Milan, Italy
- Genre: Opera
- Years active: 1914-1948

Francesco Merli (28 January 1887 – 11 December 1976) was an Italian operatic tenor, particularly associated with heavy roles such as Otello, Canio and Calaf. He ranks as one of the finest dramatic tenors of the inter-war period.

== Life and career ==
Francesco Merli was born in Corsico (Milan), son of Luigi Merli and Emilia Cova. and studied in Milan, with Carlo Negrini and Adelaide Borghi. In 1914, he won second prize at a singing competition in Parma, being edged out of first place by the great Beniamino Gigli. He made his debut at La Scala, Milan, in 1916, as Alvaro in Spontini's Fernand Cortez.

Merli would sing widely in Italy and South America during the next decade, and also toured Australia in 1928 with an opera company composed of leading La Scala singers and sponsored by Dame Nellie Melba (who also sang during that tour, in roles such as Mimi in La bohème, despite being 67 years old). The tour included Merli singing Calaf in the Australian premiere of Puccini's Turandot.

He appeared regularly in London at the Royal Opera House, Covent Garden, from 1926 to 1930, where, among other things, he was the first Calaf to be heard in Great Britain. He made his Paris debut at the Palais Garnier in 1935, as Pollione in Norma. His only season at the Metropolitan Opera in New York City occurred in 1932. He made his debut at the Met on 2 March of that year, as Radames in Aida; but his performances there were not deemed a success due to the effects of poor health. Thereafter, La Scala became his operatic base and his career tailed off during World War II.

He was renowned for his vocal strength, penetrating tone and incisive diction. These qualities enabled him to tackle a wide operatic repertory, ranging from bel canto works through verismo roles to heroic parts such as Verdi's Otello. Other famous operas that he appeared in included, among others, Guillaume Tell, Il pirata, Il trovatore, La forza del destino, Andrea Chénier, Manon Lescaut and Pagliacci.

His portrayal of Otello became world-famous, as was his interpretation of Calaf in Turandot. In 1938, he participated in a complete recording of the latter work, together with Gina Cigna and Magda Olivero. He also made numerous recordings of opera arias. These recordings, like the complete Turandot, have been re-issued on CD.

Merli also created the role of Baldo in Respighi's Belfagor in 1923 but recorded none of its music for posterity. He retired from the stage in 1948 and died, aged 89, in Milan.

== Sources ==
- Roland Mancini and Jean-Jacques Rouveroux, (orig. H. Rosenthal and J. Warrack, French edition), Guide de l’opéra, Les indispensables de la musique (Fayard, 1995). ISBN 2-213-59567-4
- The Metropolitan Opera Encyclopedia, edited by David Hamilton.
