= List of compositions by Ottorino Respighi =

This is a complete list of the compositions by Ottorino Respighi (1879–1936).

This list can be sorted by catalogue number (P), year composed, title, and genre.

Catalog numbers were attributed by Potito Pedarra, an Italian musicologist who dedicated most of his activity to the study of the works of Respighi.

Cat.	Year	Title	Genre	Notes
P 001	1893	Piccola ouverture	Orchestra: small orchestra	
P 002	1894	Preludio	Orchestra: small orchestra	
P 003	1894	Harmonics schoolwork	Schoolwork	
P 004	1895	Harmonics schoolwork	Schoolwork	
P 005	1896	Polyphony schoolwork	Schoolwork	
P 006	1896	Andante	Chamber music: piano	
P 007	1896	Andante	Chamber music: piano	
P 008	1896	L'ultima ebbrezza!	Song: voice and instrument	Romance for piano and soprano. Text by Ada Negri
P 009	1896	Lagrime!	Song: voice and instrument	Romance for piano and tenor. Text by Ada Negri
P 010	1896	Allegro da concerto in B minor	Chamber music: piano	
P 011	1896	Notturno	Song: voice and instrument	Romance for piano and tenor. Text by Ada Negri
P 012	1897	Tanto bella!	Song: voice and instrument	Romance for piano and tenor
P 013	1897	Gösdemlan (Scorze di melone)	Chamber music: piano	Piano four hands
P 014	1897	Counterpoint schoolwork	Schoolwork	
P 015	1897	Sonata in D minor	Chamber music	For violin and piano
P 016	1897	Sonata in F minor	Chamber music: piano	
P 017	1897	Salutazione angelica	Song: choir, voice and orchestra	For soprano, choir and orchestra
P 018	1898	String quartet no. 1 in D major	Chamber music	
P 019	1898	Cortège	Chamber music	For string quartet. After Moritz Moszkowski
P 020	1898	String quartet no. 2 in B♭ major	Chamber music	
P 021	1898	Quintet in G minor	Chamber music	For wind instruments
P 022	1898	Suite No. 1 in G major	Chamber music: piano	
P 023	1898	Preludio con fuoco in B♭ minor / Fuga reale a tre voci in C major	Chamber music: piano	
P 024	1899	Christus	Song: choir, voice and orchestra	Cantata in 2 parts
P 025	1899	Fuga reale	Schoolwork	For 4 voices
P 026	1900	Fuga	Schoolwork	For string quartet
P 027	1900	Double quartet in D minor	Chamber music	For 4 violins, 2 violas, 2 cellos
P 028	1900	Symphonic variations	Orchestra: large orchestra	
P 029	1900	I persiani	Song: choir, voice and orchestra	Cantata. After Aeschylus. (First version)
P 030	1901	Preludio, corale e fuga	Orchestra: large orchestra	
P 031	1901	Sei pezzi: 1. Berceuse; 2. Melodia; 3. Leggenda; 4. Valse caressante; 5. Serenata; 6. Aria	Chamber music	For violin and piano
P 032	1901	Aria	Orchestra: string orchestra	For strings and organo
P 033	1901	String quintet	Chamber music	Unfinished
P 034	1901	Suite in E major	Orchestra: large orchestra	Revision: P 051
P 035	1902	Quintet in F minor	Chamber music	For piano and string quartet
P 036	1902	Leggenda	Orchestra: instrument and orchestra	For violin and orchestra
P 037	1902	Waltz in C♯ minor	Chamber music: piano	For piano four hands
P 038	1902	Berceuse	Chamber music	For strings
P 039	1902	Miranda	Song: voice and instrument	For voice and piano. Text by Antonio Fogazzaro
P 040	1902	Piano Concerto in A minor	Orchestra: instrument and orchestra	
P 041	1902	Suite	Orchestra: string orchestra	For strings
P 042	1902	Melodia e Valse caressante	Orchestra: instrument and orchestra	For flute and strings
P 043	1903	Suite	Chamber music: piano	
P 044	1903	Sei pezzi: 1. Valse caressante; 2. Canone; 3. Notturno; 4. Minuetto; 5. Studio; 6. Intermezzo-Serenata; Preludio in D minor, p043a	Chamber music: piano	
P 045	1903	Humoreske	Orchestra: instrument and orchestra	For violin and orchestra
P 046	1903	String quartet in D♭ major	Chamber music	
P 047	1903	Minuetto	Orchestra: string orchestra	For strings
P 048	1903	Di sera	Orchestra: instrument and orchestra	Adagio for 2 oboes and strings
P 049	1903	Violin Concerto in A major	Orchestra: instrument and orchestra	
P 050	1903	Fantasia slava in G minor	Orchestra: instrument and orchestra	For piano and orchestra
P 051	1903	Suite in E major: 1. Adagio - Allegro vivo; 2. Adagio; 3. Allegretto vivace; 4. Allegro energico	Orchestra: large orchestra	Revision of P 034
P 052	1904	Storia breve	Song: voice and instrument	For mezzo-soprano and piano. Text by Ada Negri
P 053	1904	String quartet no. 3 in D major	Chamber music	
P 054	1904	Serenata	Orchestra: small orchestra	
P 055	1905	Re Enzo	Opera	Libretto by Alberto Donini
P 056	1905	Preludio	Chamber music	For organ
P 057	1905	Suite. Pour instruments d'archet et flûte	Orchestra: instrument and orchestra	For flute and strings
P 058	1905	Suite in G major: 1. Preludio; 2. Aria; 3. Pastorale; 4. Cantico	Orchestra: string orchestra	For strings and organ
P 059	1906	Burlesca	Orchestra: large orchestra	
P 060	1906	I persiani	Song: choir, voice and orchestra	Cantata. After Aeschylus. (Second version)
P 061	1906	Quartet in D major	Chamber music	For quinton, viola d'amore, viola da gamba, viola da basso
P 062	1906	Cinque pezzi: 1. Romanza; 2. Aubade; 3. Madrigale; 4. Berceuse; 5. Humoresque	Chamber music	For violin and piano
P 063	1906	Luce	Song: voice and instrument	For mezzo-soprano and piano. Text by Ada Negri
P 064	1906	Nebbie	Song: voice and instrument	For mezzo-soprano and piano. Text by Ada Negri
P 065	1906	Nevicata	Song: voice and instrument	For mezzo-soprano and piano. Text by Ada Negri
P 066	1906	Contrasto	Song: voice and instrument	For mezzo-soprano and piano. Text by Carlo Zangarini
P 067	1906	Invito alla danza	Song: voice and instrument	For mezzo-soprano and piano. Text by Carlo Zangarini
P 068	1906	Scherzo	Song: voice and instrument	For soprano and piano. Text by Carlo Zangarini
P 069	1906	Stornellatrice	Song: voice and instrument	For soprano and piano. Text by Carlo Zangarini and Alberto Donini
P 070	1906	Stornello from Re Enzo	Song: voice and instrument	For 1/2 voices and piano. Text by Alberto Donini
P 071	1906	Cinque canti all'antica: 1. L'udir talvolta (text by Giovanni Boccaccio); 2. Ma come potrei (text by Giovanni Boccaccio); 3. Ballata (text by Giovanni Boccaccio); 4. Bella porta di rubini; 5. Canzone di Re Enzo (text by Alberto Donini)	Song: voice and instrument	For mezzo-soprano and piano
P 072	1906	Sonata II	Transcriptions	For viola d'amore and cembalo. Original music by Attilio Ariosti
P 073	1906	Sonata VI in D major	Transcriptions	For viola d'amore and cembalo. Original music by Attilio Ariosti
P 074	1907	Notturno	Orchestra: large orchestra	
P 075	1908	Concerto all'antica	Orchestra: instrument and orchestra	For violin and orchestra. Also known as Concerto in stile antico
P 076	1908	Al mulino	Opera	Unfinished. Libretto by Alberto Donini
P 077	1908	Sonata VI	Transcriptions	For violin and piano. Original music by Pietro Locatelli
P 078	1908	Sonata in C	Transcriptions	For violin and piano. Original music by Nicola Porpora
P 079	1908	Pastorale	Transcriptions	For violin and piano. Original music by Giuseppe Tartini
P 080	1908	Sonata in E	Transcriptions	For violin and piano. Original music by Giuseppe Tartini
P 081	1908	Sonata in A minor	Transcriptions	For violin and piano. Original music by Francesco Maria Veracini
P 082	1908	Sonata VI	Transcriptions	For violin and piano. Original music by Francesco Maria Veracini
P 083	1908	Sonata VII	Transcriptions	For violin and piano. Original music by Francesco Maria Veracini
P 084	1908	Sonata in re F XIII n. 6	Transcriptions	For violin and piano. Original music by Antonio Vivaldi
P 085	1908	Sonata in E minor	Transcriptions	For violin, strings and organ. Original music by Johann Sebastian Bach
P 086	1908	Pastorale	Transcriptions	For violin and strings. Original music by Giuseppe Tartini
P 087	1908	Ciaccona	Transcriptions	For violin, strings and organ. Original music by Tomaso Antonio Vitali
P 088	1908	Il lamento di Arianna	Transcriptions	Harmonization and orchestration by Repighi. Original music by Claudio Monteverdi
P 089	1909	Sei melodie: 1. In alto mare (text by Enrico Panzacchi); 2. Abbandono (text by Annie Vivanti); 3. Mattinata (text by Gabriele D'Annunzio); 4. Povero cor (text by Arturo Graf); 5. Si tu veux (text by Victor Hugo); 6. Soupir (text by Sully Prudhomme)	Song: voice and instrument	For voice and piano
P 090	1909	Sei liriche: 1. O falce di luna; 2. Van li effluvi de le rose (text by Gabriele D'Annunzio); 3. Au milieu du jardin (text by Jean Moréas); 4. Nöel ancien; 5. Serenata indiana (text by P. B. Shelley); 6. Pioggia (text by Vittoria Aganoor Pompilj)	Song: voice and instrument	For mezzo-soprano and piano. First series
P 091	1909	String quartet in D minor (Ernst ist das Leben, heiter ist die Kunst)	Chamber music	
P 092	1910	Tre pezzi	Chamber music	For organ
P 093	1910	Pietà ti prenda, mio Dio	Transcriptions	Aria for contralto. After Bach's St Matthew Passion
P 094	1910	Semirâma	Opera	Libretto by Alessandro Cerè
P 094a	1910	Semirâma	Song: voice and instrument	Version for voice and piano of the opera P 094
P 095	1911	Aretusa	Song: voice and orchestra	Poemetto lirico for mezzo-soprano and orchestra. Text after P. B. Shelley
P 095a	1911	Aretusa	Song: voice and instrument	Version for voice and piano of P 095
P 096	1911	E se un giorno tornasse...	Song: voice and instrument	Recitativo per mezzo-soprano. Text by Vittoria Aganoor Pompilj
P 097	1912	Sei liriche: 1. Notte (text by Ada Negri); 2. Su una violetta morta (text by P. B. Shelley); 3. Le repos en Égypte (text by Albert Samain); 4. Noël ancien (n. 2); 5. Piccola mano bianca; 6. Nel giardino (text by Francesco Rocchi)	Song: voice and instrument	For mezzo-soprano and piano. Second series
P 098	1912	Antiche cantate d'amore: 1. Al tramontar del giorno (original music by Bernardo Pasquini); 2. Quanta invidia mi fai (original music by Benedetto Marcello); 3. Cantata (original music by Benedetto Marcello); 4. Son come farfallette; 5. Evviva Rosabella (original music by Baldassare Galuppi)	Transcriptions	For voice and piano
P 099	1914	Ouverture carnevalesca	Orchestra: large orchestra	
P 100	1914	Marie Victoire	Opera	Libretto by Edmond Guiraud
P 101	1914	Il tramonto	Song: voice and orchestra	Poemetto lirico for mezzo-soprano and string quartet. Text after P. B. Shelley
P 101a	1914	Il tramonto	Song: voice and instrument	Version for voice and piano of P 101
P 102	1914	Sinfonia drammatica	Orchestra: large orchestra	
P 103	1915	Quattro rispetti toscani: 1. Quando nasceste voi; 2. Venitelo a vedere 'l mí piccino; 3. Viene di là, lontano lontano; 4. Razzolan, sopra a l'aia, le galline	Song: voice and instrument	For soprano and piano. Text by Arturo Birga
P 104	1915	La sensitiva	Song: voice and orchestra	Poema lirico for mezzo-soprano and orchestra. Text after P. B. Shelley
P 104a	1915	La sensitiva	Song: voice and instrument	Version for voice and piano of P 104
P 105	1915	Canzone e danza. Sopra temi popolari russi per coro e orchestra. La canzone degli alatori e la canzone della strada	Song: choir, voice and orchestra	
P 105b	1916	Toccata in D Dorian	Chamber music: piano	
P 106	1916	Fontane di Roma: 1. La fontana di Valle Giulia all'alba; 2. La fontana del Tritone al mattino; 3. La fontana di Trevi al meriggio; 4. La fontana di Villa Medici al tramonto	Orchestra: large orchestra	Symphonic poem
P 107	1917	Deità silvane: 1. I fauni; 2. Musica in horto; 3. Egle; 4. Acqua; 5. Crepuscolo	Song: voice and instrument	For soprano and piano. Text by Antonio Rubino
P 108	1917	Cinque liriche: 1. I tempi assai lontani; 2. Canto funebre (text by P. B. Shelley); 3. Par les soires; 4. Par l'etreinte (text by Jacques de Fersen); 5. La fine (text by Rabindranath Tagore)	Song: voice and instrument	For voice and piano
P 109	1917	Antiche danze ed arie per liuto. Prima suite (secolo XVI): 1. Balletto detto "Il conte Orlando" (original music by Simone Molinaro); 2. Gagliarda (original music by Vincenzo Galilei); 3. Villanella; 4. Passo mezzo e mascherada	Transcriptions	For orchestra
P 110	1917	Violin Sonata in B minor	Chamber music	For violin and piano
P 111	1917	Passacaglia	Transcriptions	For piano. Original music for organ by Girolamo Frescobaldi
P 112	1917	Preludio e fuga in G minor	Transcriptions	For piano. Original music for organ by Girolamo Frescobaldi
P 113	1917	Toccata e fuga in A minor	Transcriptions	For piano. Original music for organ by Girolamo Frescobaldi
P 114	1917	Antiche danze ed arie per liuto. Prima suite (secoli XVI-XVII): 1. Balletto detto "Il conte Orlando" (original music by Simone Molinaro); 2. Villanella; 3. Gagliarda (original music by Vincenzo Galilei); 4. Italiana; 5. Siciliana; 6. Passacaglia (original music by Ludovico Roncalli)	Transcriptions	For piano
P 115	1917	Fontane di Roma	Chamber music: piano	Version for piano four hands of P 106
P 116	1917	Antiche danze ed arie per liuto. Prima suite (secolo XVI)	Transcriptions	Version for piano four hands of P 114
P 117	1918	Ai lancieri "Vittorio Emanuele II"	Song: choir, voice and orchestra	Hymn for voices and trumpets
P 118	1918	Nun komm der Heiden Heiland	Transcriptions	For violin, cellos and double basses. Original music by Johann Sebastian Bach, on "Nun komm, der Heiden Heiland"
P 119	1918	Il flauto di Pane	Song: voice and orchestra	
P 120	1918	La Boutique fantasque	Ballet	After music by Gioachino Rossini
P 120a	1918	La Boutique fantasque	Chamber music: piano	Version for piano of P 120
P 121	1919	La donna sul sarcofago	Song: voice and instrument	For voice and piano. Text by Gabriele D'Annunzio
P 122	1919	La statua	Song: voice and instrument	For voice and piano. Text by Gabriele D'Annunzio
P 123	1919	Due liriche: 1. Voici Noël; 2. Il pleut, bergère (after L'hymnaire d'Adonis by J. de Fersen)	Song: voice and instrument	For voice and piano
P 124	1919	Ballata delle gnomidi in A major	Orchestra: large orchestra	Symphonic poem after a text by Carlo Clausetti
P 125	1920	Quattro liriche: 1. Un sogno; 2. La Najade; 3. La sera; 4. Sopra un'aria antica	Song: voice and instrument	For voice and piano. Text from Il poema paradisiaco by Gabriele D'Annunzio
P 126	1920	Le astuzie femminili	Transcriptions	Opera by Domenico Cimarosa revised by Respighi
P 127	1920	Intermezzo from La serva padrona	Transcriptions	Original music by Giovanni Paisiello
P 128	1920	Sèvres de la vieille France	Ballet	
P 128a	1920	Sèvres de la vieille France	Chamber music: piano	Piano version of P 128
P 129	1920	La pentola magica	Ballet	
P 129a	1920	La pentola magica	Chamber music: piano	Piano version of P 129
P 130	1920	Scherzo veneziano	Ballet	
P 131	1920	Tre preludi sopra melodie gregoriane	Chamber music: piano	
P 132	1921	Quattro liriche su parole di poeti armeni.: 1. No, non è morto il figlio tuo; 2. La mamma è come il pane caldo; 3. Io sono la madre (text by Costant Zarian); 4. Mattino di luce, sole di giustizia	Song: voice and instrument	For voice and piano
P 133	1921	Adagio con variazioni	Orchestra: instrument and orchestra	For cello and orchestra
P 134	1921	La bella addormentata nel bosco	Opera	Libretto by Gian Bistolfi. Marionette version of P 176
P 135	1921	Concerto gregoriano	Orchestra: instrument and orchestra	For violin and orchestra
P 135a	1921	Concerto gregoriano	Chamber music	Version for violin and piano of P 135
P 136	1922	La primavera	Song: choir, voice and orchestra	Lyric poem
P 136a	1922	La primavera	Song: voice and instrument	Version for voice and piano of P 136
P 137	1922	Belfagor	Opera	Libretto by Claudio Guastalla
P 138	1923	Antiche danze e arie per liuto. Seconda suite (secoli XVI-XVII): 1. Laura soave (original music by Fabritio Caroso); 2. Danza rustica (original music by Jean-Baptiste Besard); 3. Campanae parisienses (unknown author) - Aria (original music by Marin Mersenne); 4. Bergamasca (original music by Bernardo Gianoncelli)	Transcriptions	For orchestra
P 139	1923	Antiche danze e arie per liuto. Seconda suite (secoli XVI-XVII)	Transcriptions	Piano version of P 138
P 140	1924	Belfagor	Orchestra: large orchestra	Ouverture from P 137
P 141	1924	Pini di Roma: 1. I pini di villa Borghese; 2. I pini presso una catacomba; 3. I pini del Gianicolo; 4. I pini della Via Appia	Orchestra: large orchestra	Symphonic poem
P 142	1924	Pini di Roma	Chamber music: piano	Version for piano four hands of P 141
P 143	1924	Quattro arie scozzesi: 1. Wen the Key come Hame; 2. Within a Mile of Edinburgh; 3. My Heart in the Highlands; 4. The Pipe of Dundee	Song: voice and instrument	For voice and piano
P 144	1924	Quartetto dorico	Chamber music	For string quartet
P 145	1925	Concerto in modo misolidio	Orchestra: instrument and orchestra	For piano and orchestra
P 145a	1925	Concerto in modo misolidio	Chamber music: piano	Version for two pianos of P 145
P 146	1925	Poema autunnale	Orchestra: instrument and orchestra	For violin and orchestra
P 146a	1925	Poema autunnale	Chamber music	Version for violin and piano of P 146
P 147	1925	Deità silvane: 1. I fauni; 2. Musica in horto; 3. Egle; 4. Acqua; 5. Crepuscolo	Song: voice and orchestra	Lyrics for soprano and chamber orchestra
P 148	1925	Rossiniana: 1. Capri e Taormina; 2. Lamento; 3. Intermezzo; 4. Tarantella puro sangue	Orchestra: large orchestra	Orchestral suite after Les riens by Gioachino Rossini
P 149	1926	Sei pezzi per bambini: 1. Romanza; 2. Canto di caccia siciliano; 3. Canzone armena; 4. Natale, Natale!; 5. Cantilena scozzese; 6. Piccoli Highlanders	Chamber music: piano	For piano four hands
P 150	1926	Vetrate di chiesa. Quattro impressioni per orchestra: 1. La fuga in Egitto; 2. S. Michele Arcangelo; 3. Il mattutino di S. Chiara; 4. S. Gregorio Magno	Orchestra: large orchestra	
P 151	1927	Trittico botticelliano: 1. La Primavera; 2. L'adorazione dei Magi; 3. La nascita di Venere	Orchestra: small orchestra	
P 152	1927	La campana sommersa	Opera	Libretto by Claudio Guastalla
P 153	1928	Impressioni brasiliane (Suite brasiliana): 1. Notte tropicale; 2. Butantan; 3. Canzone e danza	Orchestra: large orchestra	
P 154	1928	Gli uccelli: 1. Preludio (after music by Bernardo Pasquini); 2. La colomba (after music by Jacques de Gallot); 3. La gallina (after music by Jean-Philippe Rameau); 4. L'usignolo; 5. Il cucú (after music by Bernardo Pasquini)	Orchestra: small orchestra	Suite for small orchestra
P 154a	1928	Gli uccelli	Chamber music: piano	Piano version of P 154
P 155	1928	Canzone sarda	Song: voice and instrument	For voice and piano
P 156	1928	Toccata	Orchestra: instrument and orchestra	For piano and orchestra
P 157	1928	Feste Romane: 1. Circenses; 2. Il Giubileo; 3. L'Ottobrata; 4. La Befana	Orchestra: large orchestra	Symphonic poem
P 158	1929	Preludio e fuga in D major	Transcriptions	For orchestra. Original music by Johann Sebastian Bach
P 159	1930	Passacaglia	Transcriptions	For orchestra. Original music by Johann Sebastian Bach
P 160	1930	5 Etude-tableaux	Transcriptions	Orchestration by Respighi. Original music by Sergei Rachmaninoff
P 161	1930	Vocalism	Song: voice and instrument	For soprano or tenor and piano
P 162	1930	Vocalism	Song: voice and instrument	For mezzo-soprano or baritone and piano
P 163	1930	Vocalism	Song: voice and instrument	For contralto or bass and piano
P 164	1930	Le funtanelle	Song: voice and instrument	For voice and piano. Popular melody from Abruzzo
P 165	1930	Due liriche: 1. Mon elué; 2. Kroung (La Cigogne)	Song: voice and instrument	For voice and piano
P 166	1930	Lauda per la natività del Signore	Song: choir, voice and orchestra	For voices, choir, pastoral instruments and piano four hands. Text by Jacopone da Todi
P 167	1930	Tre Corali: 1. Nun komm, der Heiden Heiland; 2. Meine Seele erhebt den Herren; 3. Wachet auf, ruft uns die Stimme	Transcriptions	For orchestra. From Choralvorspiele for organ by Johann Sebastian Bach
P 168	1930	Suite della tabacchiera	Chamber music	Scherzo for wind instruments and piano four hands
P 169	1930	Metamorphoseon modi XII	Orchestra: large orchestra	Theme and variations for orchestra
P 170	1931	Maria egiziaca	Opera	Libretto by Claudio Guastalla
P 171	1931	Belkis, regina di Saba	Ballet	
P 171a	1931	Belkis, regina di Saba	Song: voice and instrument	Version for voice and piano of P 171
P 172	1931	Antiche danze ed arie per liuto. Terza suite (secoli XVI-XVII): 1. Italiana; 2. Arie di corte (original music by Jean-Baptiste Besard); 3. Siciliana; 4. Passacaglia (original music by Ludovico Roncalli)	Transcriptions	For orchestra
P 173	1932	Huntingtower	Orchestra: music for band	Ballade for band
P 174	1933	Concerto a cinque	Orchestra: instrument and orchestra	For oboe, trumpet, violin, double bass, piano and string orchestra
P 175	1933	La fiamma	Opera	Libretto by Claudio Guastalla
P 176	1933	La bella dormente nel bosco	Opera	Libretto by Gian Bistolfi. Standard opera version of P 134
P 177	1934	Belkis, regina di Saba	Orchestra: large orchestra	Suite from ballet P 171
P 178	1934	Orfeo	Transcriptions	Revision by Respighi of the opera by Claudio Monteverdi. Libretto revised by Claudio Guastalla
P 179	1935	Didone	Transcriptions	Cantata for soprano and orchestra. Original music by Benedetto Marcello
P 180	1935	Lucrezia	Opera	Libretto by Claudio Guastalla. Music completed by Elsa Respighi and Ennio Porrino
P 181	Unknown	Sonata in A minor	Chamber music: piano	First version
P 182	Unknown	Sonata in A minor	Chamber music: piano	Second version
P 183	Unknown	Presto	Chamber music: piano	
P 184	Unknown	Lento	Chamber music: piano	
P 185	Unknown	Scherzo	Chamber music: piano	
P 186	Unknown	Allegretto vivace	Chamber music	For violin and piano
P 187	Unknown	Giga	Chamber music	For violin and piano
P 188	Unknown	Adagio con variazioni	Chamber music	For cello and piano
P 189	Unknown	Sonata	Chamber music	For cello and piano
P 190	Unknown	String quartet in D major	Chamber music	
P 191	Unknown	Scherzo	Chamber music	For string quartet
P 192	Unknown	La Pirrica	Transcriptions	For orchestra. Original music (Polacca and Preludio) by Frédéric Chopin
P 193	Unknown	Untitled symphonic composition	Orchestra: large orchestra	Unfinished
P 194	Unknown	Cello concerto in D major no. 2	Transcriptions	Orchestral version. Original music by Luigi Boccherini
P 195	Unknown	Follia di Spagna	Transcriptions	For violin and small orchestra. Original music by Arcangelo Corelli
P 196	Unknown	Solvejgs Lied	Transcriptions	For choir. Original music by Edvard Grieg
P 197	Unknown	Inno omerico ad Atena	Song: choir, voice and orchestra	Incidental music. Text by R. Cantarella. Unfinished
P 198	Unknown	Kirie	Song: voices	Lost
P 199	Unknown	Tre canti: 1. Ballata; 2. Stornellatrice; 3. Notte	Song: voice and orchestra	For baritone and orchestra

== See also ==
- List of operas by Ottorino Respighi

== Sources ==
- Pedarra, Potito (1985). "Catalogo delle composizioni di Ottorino Respighi". In Rostirolla, Giancarlo (ed.). Ottorino Respighi (in Italian). Torino: ERI. ISBN 88-3-970335-7.
- Waterhouse, Janet; Waterhouse, John C. G; Pedarra, Potito (2001). "Respighi, Ottorino". The New Grove Dictionary of Music and Musicians. Oxford University Press.
- "Ottorino RESPIGHI. Catalogo delle composizioni". flaminioonline.it (in Italian).
- "Catalogo delle opere a cura di Potito Pedarra". ottorinorespighi.it (in Italian).
