= List of operas by Ottorino Respighi =

This is a complete list of the operas by Ottorino Respighi (1879–1936).

Cat.	Year composed	Title	Genre	Subdivisions	Libretto	Première date	Place, theatre	Notes
P 055	1905	Re Enzo	opera comica	3 acts	Alberto Donini	12 March 1905	Bologna, Teatro del Corso	
P 076	1908	Al mulino	opera	2 acts	Alberto Donini	1908	Bologna	Unfinished. Première date is a private performance for the singer Margherita Durante
P 094	1910	Semirâma	poema tragico	3 acts	Alessandro Cerè	20 November 1910	Bologna, Teatro Comunale	
P 098b	1913	La Marquise Zabeth	opera	2 acts				Unfinished. After Victor Hugo's Esca
P 100	1914	Marie Victoire	opera	4 acts	Edmond Guiraud	17 January 2004	Rome, Teatro dell'Opera	Posthumous première
P 134	1921	La bella addormentata nel bosco	fiaba musicale	3 acts	Gian Bistolfi	13 April 1922	Rome, Teatro Odescalchi	Version for marionette. See P 176 for standard opera version. After Charles Perrault's Sleeping Beauty
P 137	1922	Belfagor	commedia lirica	1 prologue, 2 acts, 1 epilogue	Claudio Guastalla	26 April 1923	Milan, Teatro alla Scala	After a comedy by Ercole Luigi Morselli
P 152	1927	La campana sommersa	opera	4 acts	Claudio Guastalla	18 November 1927	Hamburg, Stadttheater	After Gerhart Hauptmann's Die versunkene Glocke
P 170	1931	Maria egiziaca	mistero	3 acts (quadri)	Claudio Guastalla	16 March 1932	New York City, Carnegie Hall	New York première was in concert form. Scenic première:Venice, Teatro Goldoni, 10 August 1932
P 175	1933	La fiamma	melodramma	3 acts	Claudio Guastalla	23 January 1934	Rome, Teatro dell’Opera	After Hans Wiers-Jenssen's The Witch
P 176	1933	La bella dormente nel bosco	fiaba musicale	3 acts	Gian Bistolfi	9 April 1934	Turin, Teatro di Torino	Standard opera version. See P 134 for marionette version. After Charles Perrault's Sleeping Beauty
P 180	1935	Lucrezia	opera	1 act (3 movements)	Claudio Guastalla	24 February 1937	Milan, Teatro alla Scala	After Shakespeare and Titus Livius

== See also ==
- List of compositions by Ottorino Respighi

== Sources ==
- Pedarra, Potito (1985). "Catalogo delle composizioni di Ottorino Respighi". In Rostirolla, Giancarlo (ed.). Ottorino Respighi (in Italian). Torino: ERI. ISBN 88-3-970335-7.
- Waterhouse, John C. G. (1992). "Respighi, Ottorino". In Sadie, Stanley (ed.). The New Grove Dictionary of Opera. Oxford University Press. ISBN 978-0-19-522186-2.
- "Ottorino RESPIGHI. Catalogo delle composizioni suddiviso per generi musicali". l'Orchestra Virtuale del Flaminio (in Italian).
