= Sei pezzi =

Ottorino Respighi composed three pieces often referred to as Sei pezzi:

- Sei pezzi per violino e pianoforte for violin and piano
- Sei pezzi per pianoforte for piano
- Sei pezzi per bambini for piano four hands
