= Piano Concerto in A minor =

Piano Concerto in A minor may refer to:

- Piano Concerto (Grieg), Op. 16
- Piano Concerto No. 2 (Hummel), Op. 85
- Piano Concerto (Paderewski), Op. 17
- Piano Concerto (Respighi)
- Piano Concerto (Schumann), Op. 54
- Piano Concerto (Clara Schumann), Op. 7
