= Sinfonia Drammatica =

Symphony composed by Ottorino Respighi

- by Ottorino Respighi (1879-1936)
- Catalogue: P. 102
- Year: 1913-1914
- Duration: 58 minutes
- Movements: 3
- Scoring: Large romantic orchestra (including triple woodwinds, six horns, organ, and heavy percussion)

The Sinfonia Drammatica is a sprawling, massive, three-movement symphonic work written by Italian composer Ottorino Respighi between 1913 and 1914.

== Background and Composition ==
Respighi began the work in Rome in 1913, and worked on it for a full year, amidst distractions from other work, homesickness and a broken engagement. In contrast to his better-known tone poems about Rome (Fountains of Rome, Pines of Rome, and Roman Festivals), the Sinfonia is abstract music, with no program.

== Instrumentation ==
The Sinfonia is conceived on a massive, ambitious orchestral scale, requiring a triple woodwind complement; six horns and a full brass complement; organ (pedals only); a significant percussion section; and a large, dense body of strings.

== Structure ==
=== 1. Allegro energico ===
(Approx. 25 minutes) Conceived on a giant scale, with rich woodwinds and surging lyricism, the first movement has a dense late Romantic texture sometimes criticized as over-scored.

=== 2. Andante sostenuto ===
(Approx. 17 minutes) Somber and expressive, with impassioned strings and woodwinds, followed by relaxed, lyrical flute. An ardent final climax tapers into a peaceful ending.

=== 3. Allegro impetuoso - Tempo di marcia triste ===
(Approx. 18 minutes) Energetic and tragic, high, driving energy, transitioning into a quiet, restrained passage with dark bassones and lower strings. A solo oboe leads a slow processional, ending in a massive, tragic climax over pounding drums.

== Style and Influence ==
The Sinfonia reflects the late Romantic style of Respighi's early years, with influences from Wagner, Strauss, Tchaikovsky and Mahler, before his later interest in neoclassicism and Gregorian modality. One critic described it as "Bruckner meets Italy." The piece has had a mixed reception, with musicologist Jean-Pascal Vachon describing it as powerful and impressive, while the composer's widow, Elsa Respighi, dismissing it as insignificant, and another critic calling it a "shapeless blob" of fin-de-siècle Sturm und Drang.

The work was given its New York premiere in 1924 by Willem Van Hoogstraten with the New York Philharmonic. In his review, Olin Downes wrote that the work had "too much material; its development is prolix, and the musical speech is seldom original... It is also long-winded, pretentious and principally significant as a work of a composer who quite probably-in all respect to Mr. Guido Gatti-is not “a master of the symphonic style."

Later critics debated whether Respighi's work, including the Sinfonia, reflected tendencies that ultimately led to Mussolini's regime, or was simply apolitical. Respighi, along with Zandonai, Malipiero and others, endorsed the “Manifesto of Italian Musicians for the Tradition of Nineteenth-Century Romantic Art” in 1932, in reaction against modernism.

== Recordings ==
- Daniel Nazareth / Slovak Philharmonic (Recorded February 1986, Bratislava, originally released on Records International (7010-2) and later reissued on Naxos (8.550951))
- Edward Downes / BBC Philharmonic (Chandos, 1994)
- John Neschling / Orchestre Philharmonique Royal de Liège (BIS, Recorded April 2015, Released 2016)
- Robert Treviño / RAI National Symphony Orchestra
