= Six Pieces for Piano =

Six Pieces for Piano may refer to:

- Six Pieces for Piano, Op. 118 (Brahms) by Johannes Brahms
- Six Pieces from Cinderella, Op. 102 by Sergei Prokofiev
- Sei pezzi per pianoforte by Ottorino Respighi
