= Carlo Tagliabue =

Italian opera singer

- Carlo Tagliabue (photo with 1942 dedication)
- Born: 13 January 1898; Mariano Comense, Italy
- Died: 5 April 1978 (aged 80); Monza, Italy
- Occupation: Classical baritone singer

Carlo Pietro Tagliabue (13 January 1898 – 5 April 1978) was an Italian baritone.

== Life ==
Carlo Tagliabue as Tonio in Pagliacci, Teatro alla Scala, Milan, 1942

Tagliabue was born on 13 January 1898 in Mariano Comense. According to Tagliabue, his love for singing began at a young age, when his father would take him to performances at La Scala. Carlo would return singing arias in a baritone voice disproportionate to his age. He also failed his childhood choir class because he wanted to sing in a big voice and grand manner, while they required the typical boy treble voice. Around age 17 he began two years' study of music and singing under Corrado Mattioli, a teacher and director of the choral division of the Civiche Scuole popolari di Musica in Milan.

After a brief conscription during World War I, he returned to Milan and studied for one year with Leopoldo Gennai—a repertoire coach from La Scala—and Annibale Ghidotti, a blind singing teacher who, it was said, could identify a student's voice type simply by feeling their throat.

Tagliabue made his debut in Lodi, Lombardy, in Loreley and Aida. His debuts in Genoa (1923), Turin, La Scala (1930), Rome (1931), and Naples (1931) were all in Tristan und Isolde (sung in Italian). He also performed in Wagner's Götterdämmerung, Tannhäuser and Lohengrin. However, Tagliabue would go on to excel in the Verdian repertoire, especially La forza del destino, Aida, Rigoletto, La traviata, Nabucco, and Otello. He created the role of Basilio in Respighi's La fiamma in 1934.

His international career included Buenos Aires' Teatro Colón (1934), the Metropolitan Opera, New York City (1937–1939), and San Francisco Opera and Covent Garden, London (1938). Tagliabue's last performance was in 1955 at La Scala, at the famous performance of La traviata conducted by Carlo Maria Giulini and directed by Luchino Visconti, where Maria Callas scandalized the public by throwing her shoes off.

In his book Voci Parallele Giacomo Lauri-Volpi wrote, "[Tagliabue] is the only survivor of a school that knows that in Rigoletto, in Ballo in Maschera, Trovatore, Traviata a melodramatic piece should be sung, measured and breathed musically in line with the mastery of great art."

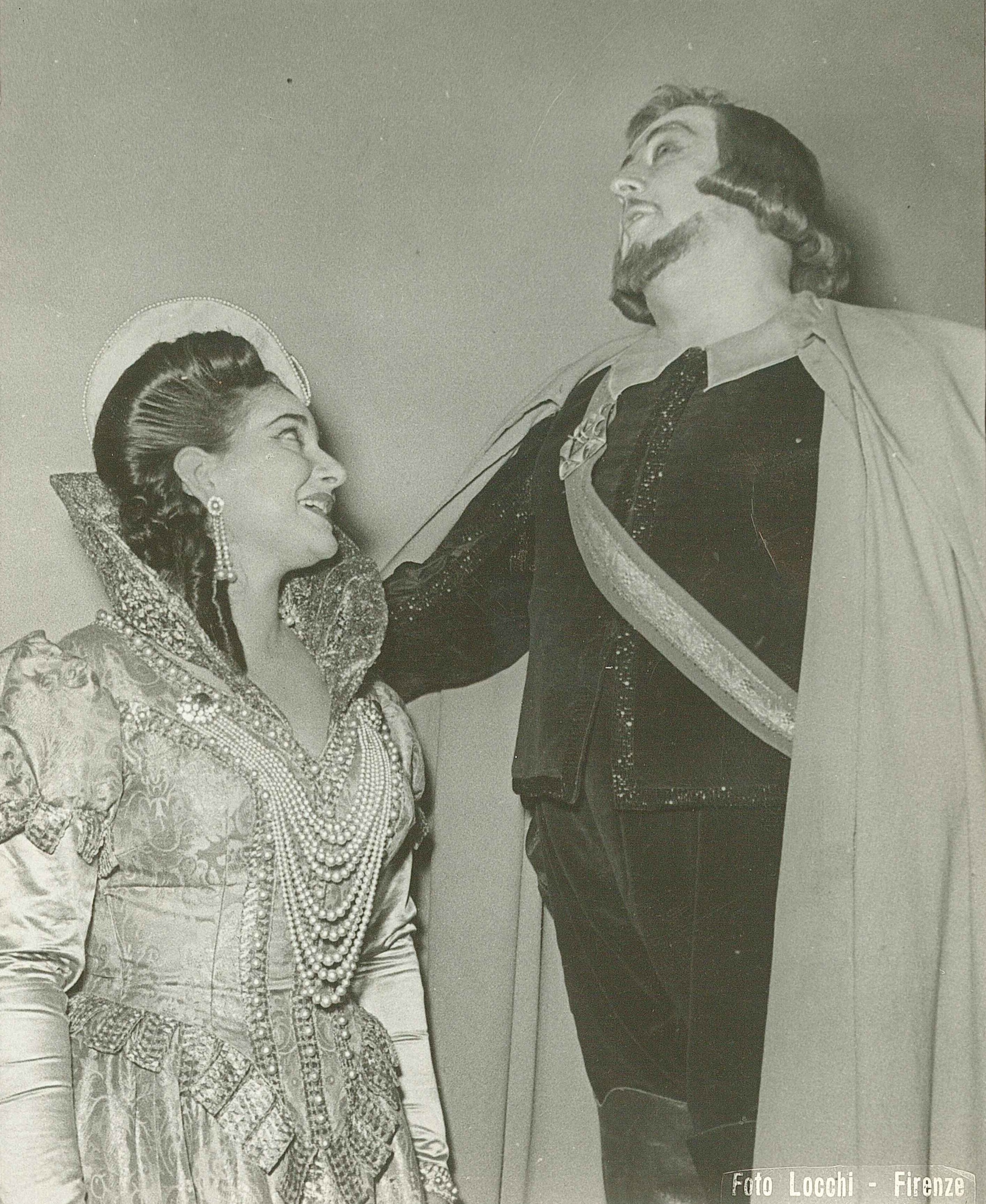
Carlo Tagliabue with Maria Callas in I puritani (Florence, 1952)

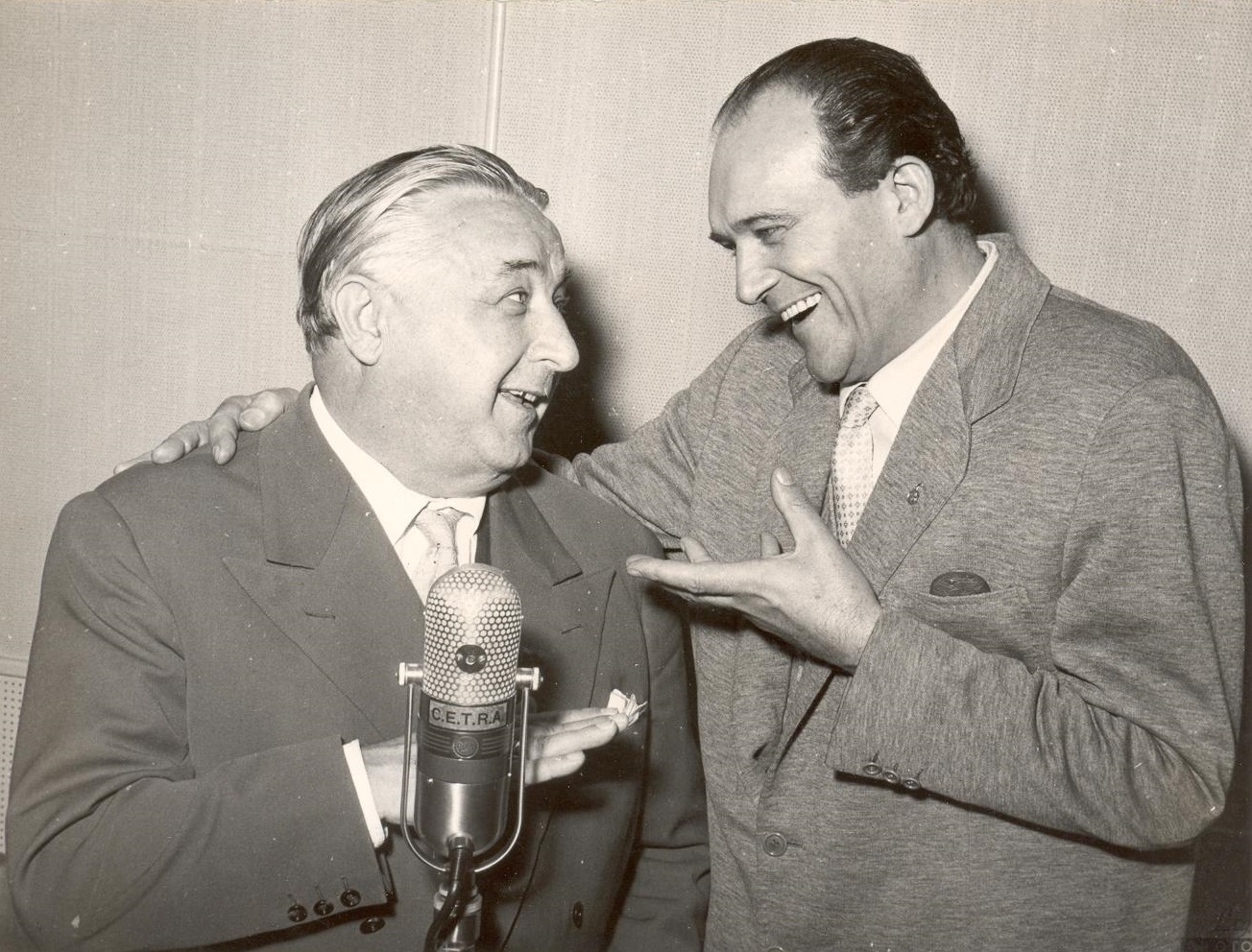
Tagliabue (left) with bass Giulio Neri at Cetra of Turin (1956)
