= Concerto in modo misolidio =

Piano concerto composed by Ottorio Respighi

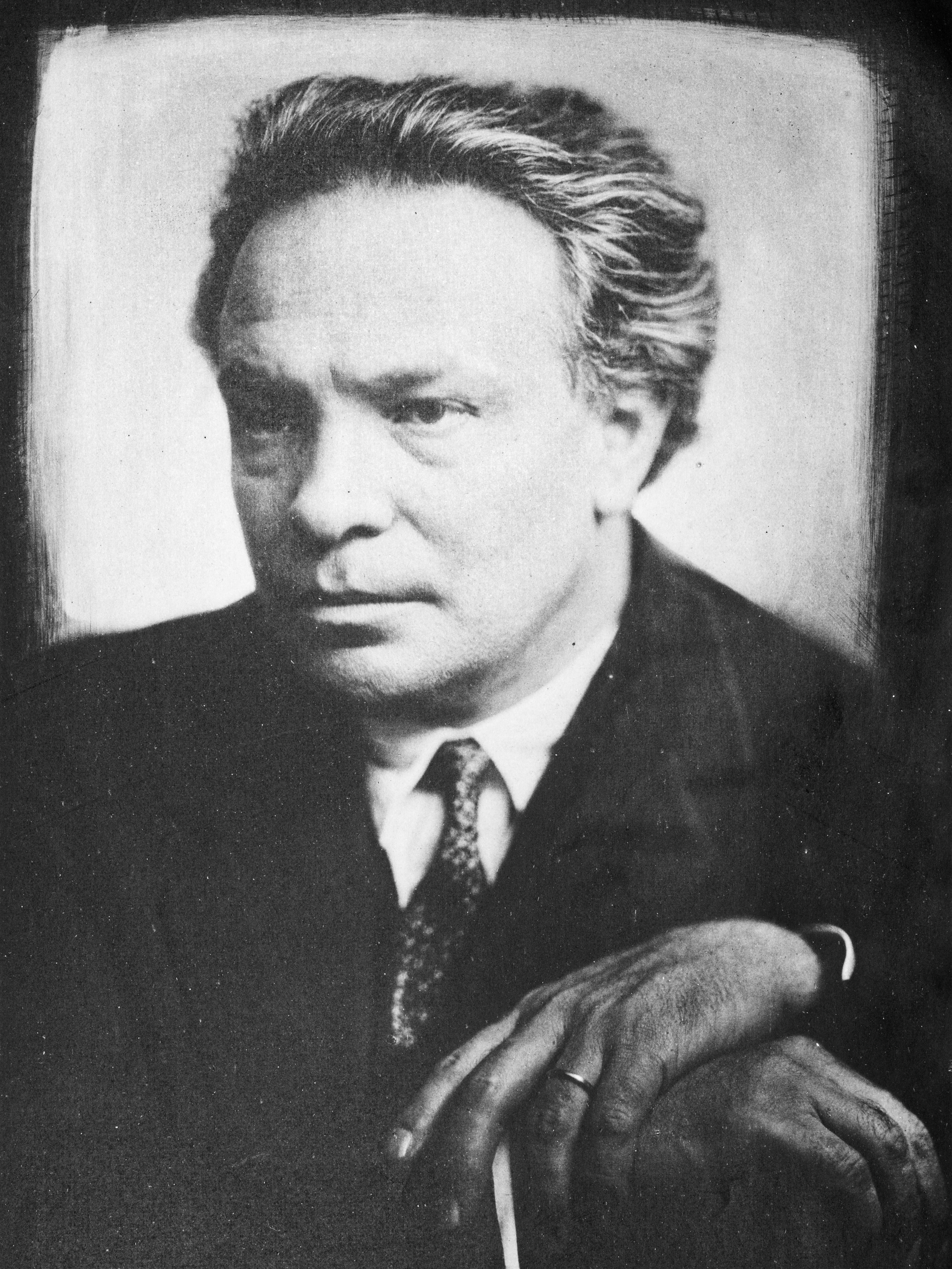
Ottorino Respighi in 1927

Concerto in modo misolidio (Concerto in the Mixolydian mode) is a concerto for piano and orchestra, composed by the Italian composer Ottorino Respighi.

== Background ==
Elsa Olivieri-Sangiacomo, composer's pupil and later his wife, studied gregorian chant. This made Respighi attracted by the mystic of the gradual. Quickly recognising the potential of melodies of this music, he tried to remodel them into the contemporary style for understanding of wider audience. He wrote the work in an incredibly short time during the summer in 1925, then immediately handed it over to the publisher. As the consequence of composer's almost superstitious abhorrence of past activities, the work was never revised thereafter. He highly prized the concerto, believing that it would live on when after all his other works had been forgotten.

The concerto was premiered at Carnegie Hall, New York City, by Respighi himself playing piano with New York Philharmonic conducted by Willem Mengelberg on 31 December 1925. He made his debut in the United States on this occasion. Though the concerto was warmly applauded by the audience, music critic Olin Downes expressed his concern about the quality of the composition. The work was performed unsuccessfully at the Concertgebouw in Amsterdam and in Berlin (on 11 November 1926) by composer on piano under the baton of Heinz Huger, and in Rome with pianist Carlo Zecchi, conducted by Bernardino Molinari (on 10 April 1927). Contrary to the composer's confidence, the work remained unknown for the next few decades.

Respighi declared he had written Concerto in modo misolidio for his nonprofessional pianism which he mostly learned himself. Some pianists today shudder at the technical difficulty of the piece, deeming it unpianistic.

The score of the work bears the motto "O clap your hands", Psalm 47.

== Structure ==
The concerto is scored for piano solo, 2 flutes, piccolo, 2 oboes, cor anglais, 2 clarinets (in B♭ and A), 2 bassoons, 4 horns (in F), 2 trumpets (in B♭), 3 trombones, tuba, timpani, harp, and strings.

It is written in three movements:

1. Moderato
2. Lento
3. Allegro energico

A typical performance of the work lasts for about 39 minutes.

=== I. Moderato ===
The movement opens with quotation of Viri Galilaei. A brief E♭ note by the orchestra in the opening bar is followed by the piano solo playing a Gregorian chant (excerpt 1).

Excerpt 1

The material of excerpt 1 is developed by relatively lengthy piano solo and the following section by the orchestra. After the exposition of a new melody (excerpt 2), the music proceeds around this theme.

Excerpt 2

The orchestra recites excerpt 1 before piano enters the rapid arpeggio passage. A canon-like motif is regarded as the third theme. The music returns to excerpt 1, preceding a piano cadenza. The cadenza that starts quietly gradually culminates from a recapitulation of excerpt 2 to the climax. The movement calmly ends with excerpt 1 echoed by orchestra accompanied with the sound of bells rung on piano.

=== II. Lento ===
The second movement is written in ternary form, quoting the hym Alléluia. The orchestra states excerpt 3 over modest piano chords.

Excerpt 3

New melodic material is introduced after repetition of excerpt 3, followed by an orchestral chorale that develops into rapid piano movement. This sequence takes place once again before the part played by solo piano. The movement's climax comes after a recapitulation of excerpt 3. Lastly, a piano solo bridges to the finale by attacca.

=== III. Allegro energico ===
The third movement is formed as a passacaglia consisting of a theme and 18 variations. The hymn Kyrie is quoted for this movement. The theme is passionately exposed by piano (excerpt 4).

Excerpt 4

The energy of the music is maintained until the variation characterized by glissando in the high register of the piano. Shortly after, the mood turns bright, and lively variations take over. Skilful piano writing brings the cheerful atmosphere back, leading to the triumphal conclusion after the brilliantly affirmative final restatement of the theme.

== Sources ==
- Booklet for CD, RESPIGHI: Piano Concerto in A minor, Concerto in modo misolidio, Chandos Records, CHAN9285
- Booklet for CD, RESPIGHI: Concerto in Modo Misolidio for Piano and Orchestra / Three Preludes on Gregorian Themes, NAXOS, 8.220176
- Score, Respighi: Concerto in modo misolidio, Bote & Bock, Berlin, 1926
