= Nelly Miricioiu =

British operatic soprano

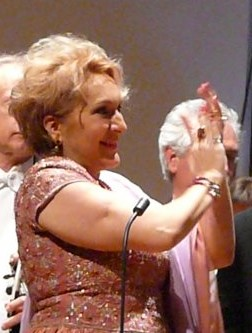
Nelly Miricioiu in 2008

Nelly Miricioiu (born 31 March 1952) is a Romanian-born British operatic soprano singing a large repertoire ranging from bel canto to verismo.

== Biography ==
Born in Adjud, Romania, Miricioiu started singing at 5 and was hailed as a child prodigy. At 9 she started studying piano and at 14 she won her first singing contest, "Young Talents, Great hopes". At 18 she sang in Pergolesi's La serva padrona and joined the Conservatory of Iași where she continued her studies with Tibi Popovici. In 1972 she was the youngest contestant in the Francisco Vinas Musical Competition in Barcelona and in 1975 she won the first prize at the very first Maria Callas Grand Prix in Athens. More first prizes followed at competitions in Geneva, Paris, Sofia, Oostend.

Miricioiu made her operatic debut in Mozart's The Magic Flute, as the Queen of the Night at Iaşi Romanian Opera, and continued to sing at Brasov Opera House between 1975 and 1978 in roles such as Mimì in La bohème, Micaëla in Carmen and Rosalinde in Die Fledermaus.

In 1981, she left Romania and months later she debuted in Glasgow at the Scottish Opera as Violetta in La traviata; Manon Lescaut and Tosca followed. The following year she made her debut at the Royal Opera House in London as Nedda in Pagliacci, opposite Jon Vickers, Piero Cappuccilli and Thomas Allen. She later appeared as Marguerite in Gounod's Faust, Antonia in The Tales of Hoffmann and Valentine in Les Huguenots. In 1983, she made her debut at La Scala in Milan in the title role of Lucia di Lammermoor, and thereafter appeared at most major opera houses of Europe: Amsterdam, Brussels, Rome, Hamburg, Geneva, Munich, Vienna, Salzburg, Paris, Madrid, Barcelona, earning considerable acclaim for her interpretation of Violetta in La traviata, amongst many other roles such as Mimì in La bohème, Cio-Cio San in Madama Butterfly, Silvana in Respighi's La fiamma, the title role in Cilea's Adriana Lecouvreur and the title role in Zandonai's Francesca da Rimini.

Miricioiu has also appeared in the United States, notably in Washington, D.C., Philadelphia, Dallas, San Francisco, and made her debut at the Metropolitan Opera in New York as Mimì (La bohème) in 1989. She also appeared in South America, notably in Santiago, and the Teatro Colón in Buenos Aires.

In 1992, she sang Amenaide in Rossini's Tancredi to great acclaim in Salzburg, and then began concentrating on the bel canto repertory, singing other Rossinian heroines such as the title roles in Armida, Semiramide, Ermione, as well as Donizetti and Bellini roles, such as in Anna Bolena, Roberto Devereux, Il pirata and Norma.

In 1996, she was trusted with the revival of the now famous Tosca production for Maria Callas at the Royal Opera House.

She began an association with Opera Rara, appearing in long-forgotten works by Rossini and Donizetti but also by composers such as Pacini and Mercadante, both in concerts and recordings, notably Ricciardo e Zoraide, Rosmonda d'Inghilterra, Maria de Rudenz, Pacini's Maria, regina d'Inghilterra, and Mercadante's Orazi e Curiazi and Emma d'Antiocchia.

Her repertory also includes Verdi roles in operas such as Ernani, Luisa Miller, I vespri siciliani, Don Carlo. She has worked with some of the most prestigious conductors and directors, and opposite leading artists of the day, such as José Carreras, Plácido Domingo, José Cura, Roberto Alagna, to name but a few.

== Discography ==
- Puccini: Tosca, Naxos
- Donizetti: Rosmonda d'Inghilterra, Opera Rara
- Donizetti: Roberto Devereux, Opera Rara
- Donizetti: Maria de Rudenz, Opera Rara
- Rossini: Ricciardo e Zoraide, Opera Rara
- Mercadante: Orazi e Curiazi, Opera Rara
- Mercadante: Emma d'Antiochia, Opera Rara
- Pacini: Maria Regina d'Inghilterra, Opera Rara
- Respighi: La fiamma, Agora
- Mascagni: Cavalleria rusticana, Chandos
- Rossini Gala, Opera Rara
- Mercadante Rediscovered, Opera Rara
- Donizetti: Szenen und Ouvertüren, Opera Rara
- La Potenza d'amore, Opera Rara
- Mercadante – Les Soirées Italiennes, Opera Rara
- Rossini: Three Tenors, Opera Rara
- Nelly Miricioiu, Etcetera
- Nelly Miricioiu – Bel Canto Portrait, Opera Rara
- Prinsengracht Concert, Vanguard
- Live at the Concertgebouw, Challenge
- Recital at Wigmore Hall, Etcetera
- Nelly Miricioiu Live in Amsterdam, Vanguard

== Awards ==
- (Romania) Romanian Royal Family: Knight of the Decoration of Nihil Sine Deo
- (Romania) Romanian Royal Family: Knight of the Decoration of the Cross of the Romanian Royal House
