= Lucrezia (opera) =

Opera by Ottorino Respighi

- Opera by Ottorino Respighi
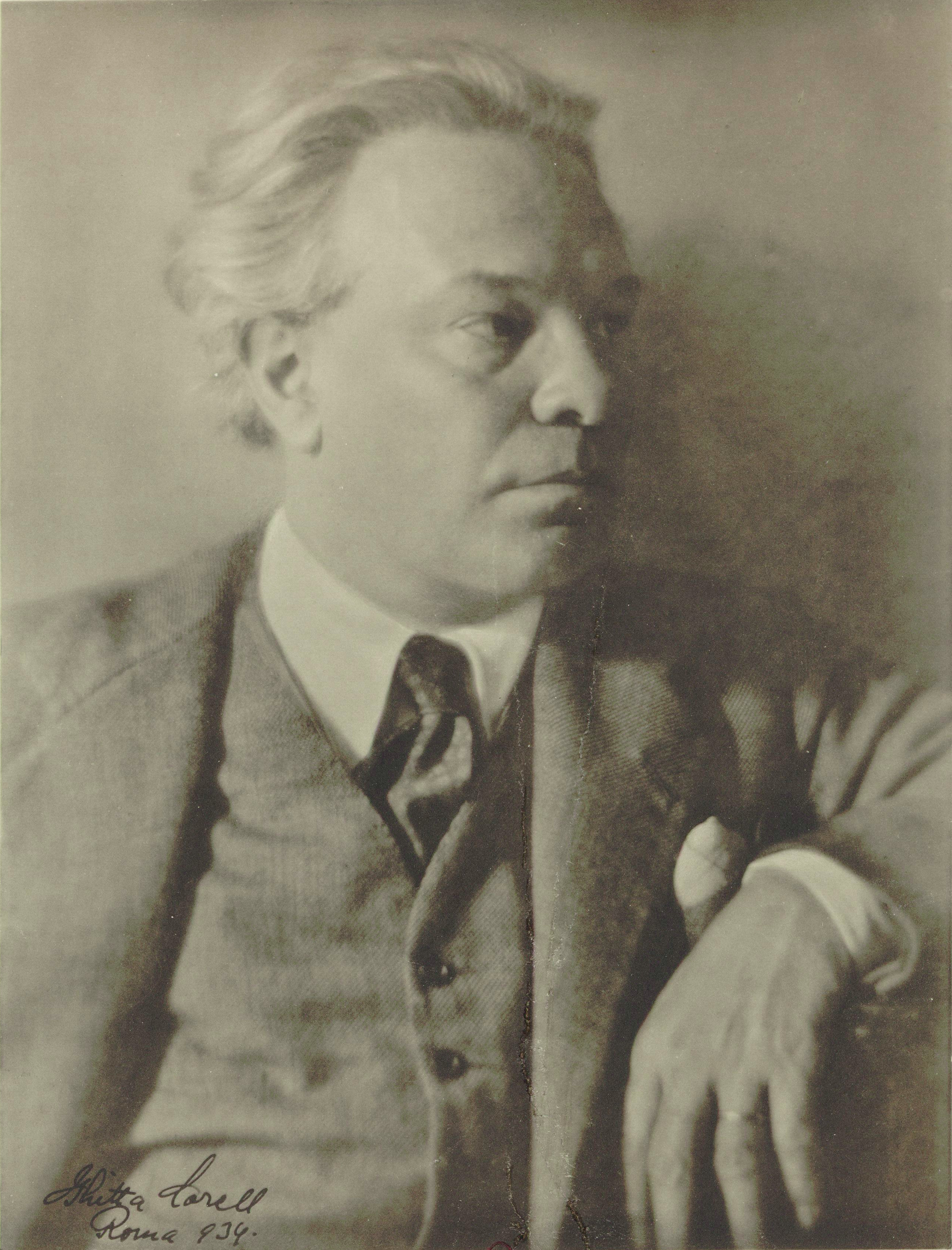
- Respighi in 1934
- Librettist: Claudio Guastalla
- Language: Italian
- Based on: The Rape of Lucrece by Shakespeare
- Premiere: 24 February 1937; La Scala, Milan

Lucrezia is an opera in one act and three tableaux by Ottorino Respighi to a libretto by Claudio Guastalla, after Livy and William Shakespeare's The Rape of Lucrece, itself based heavily on Ovid's Fasti. Respighi died before finishing the work, which was therefore completed by his wife, Elsa Respighi, and by one of his pupils, Ennio Porrino. Lucrezia premiered on 24 February 1937 at the Teatro alla Scala in Milan, in a production directed by Mario Frigerio with sets designed by Pietro Aschieri. The première had a good reception.

Lucrezia was much appreciated by the famous Italian musicologist Andrea Della Corte, who considered this opera as one of the best stage works of Respighi, thanks to the accomplished balance of expressivity and musical skill. One of the distinctive features of Lucrezia is the presence of the Voice, a character that sings from within the orchestra and describes what is happening on the stage and the emotions of the other characters.

The opera had its UK stage premiere in London, 2025, in a production directed by Stephen Barlow (director) for the Guildhall School of Music and Drama.

== Roles ==
Roles, voice types, premiere cast
Role	Voice type	Premiere cast, 24 February 1937 Conductor: Gino Marinuzzi
The Voice	mezzo-soprano	Ebe Stignani
Lucrezia	soprano	Maria Caniglia
Servia	mezzo-soprano	Maria Marcucci
Venilia	soprano	Renata Villani
Collatino	tenor	Pablo Civil
Bruto	tenor	Ettore Parmeggiani
Sesto Tarquinio	baritone	Gaetano Viviani
Tito	baritone	Leone Paci
Arunte	baritone	Eraldo Coda
Spurio Lucrezio	bass	Bruno Carmassi
Valerio	bass	Aristide Baracchi

== Instrumentation ==
Lucrezia is scored for the following instruments:

piccolo, 2 flutes, 2 oboes, English horn, 2 clarinets in B flat, 2 bassoons, 4 horns in F, 3 trumpets in B flat, 2 tenor trombones, bass trombone, tuba, cymbals, bass drum, tam-tam, strings.

== Synopsis ==
Time: 509 BC.
Place: Rome

Sesto Tarquinio (son of Tarquin the Proud, the last king of Rome), Bruto and Collatino are in the tent of Tarquinio and discuss the faithfulness of their wives; Bruto seems the most sceptical. Later they decide to return to Rome and verify directly the uprightness of their women.

Lucrezia, the wife of Collatino, tells her women a story that highlights the importance of living with honour and honesty. But during the night Tarquinio, who has become infatuated with Lucrezia, gets into the house of Collatino and rapes her.

The following day Lucrezia, overwhelmed with shame, asks Collatino to be revenged, then takes her own life. Bruto becomes one of the leaders of the rebellion against Tarquinio and his father, that leads to the overthrow of the monarchy.

== Recordings ==
1958: Oliviero De Fabritiis, Orchestra sinfonica e Coro di Milano della RAI, LP Golden Age of Opera EJS 535
The Voice: Miti Truccato Pace; Lucrezia: Anna di Cavalieri; Servia: Franca Marghinotti; Venilia: Adelide Montano; Collatino: Walter Brunelli; Bruto: Renato Gavarini	Tarquinio: Mario Sereni; Arunte: Valerio Meucci; Spurio Lucrezio: Fernando Corena; Valerio: Giovanni Ciavola
1981: Ettore Gracis, Junge Philarmonie der A.M.O.R, CD Bongiovanni, Cat. GB 2013-2
The Voice: Jone Jon; Lucrezia: Elizabeth Byrne; Collatino: Andreas Iaggi; Bruto: Giuseppe Morino	Tarquinio: Daniel Washington; Arunte: Rado Hanak
1994: Adriano, Slovak Radio Symphony Orchestra (Bratislava), CD Marco Polo, Cat. 223717
The Voice: Stefania Kaluza; Lucrezia: Michela Remor; Servia: Denisa Slepkovská; Venilia: Adriana Kohutkova; Collatino: Ludovít Ludha; Bruto: Igor Pasek	Tarquinio: Richard Haan; Tito: Ján Durco; Arunte: Rado Hanák; Spurio Lucrezio: Rado Hanák; Valerio: Ján Durco
