= Ottorino Respighi =

Italian composer and musicologist (1879–1936)

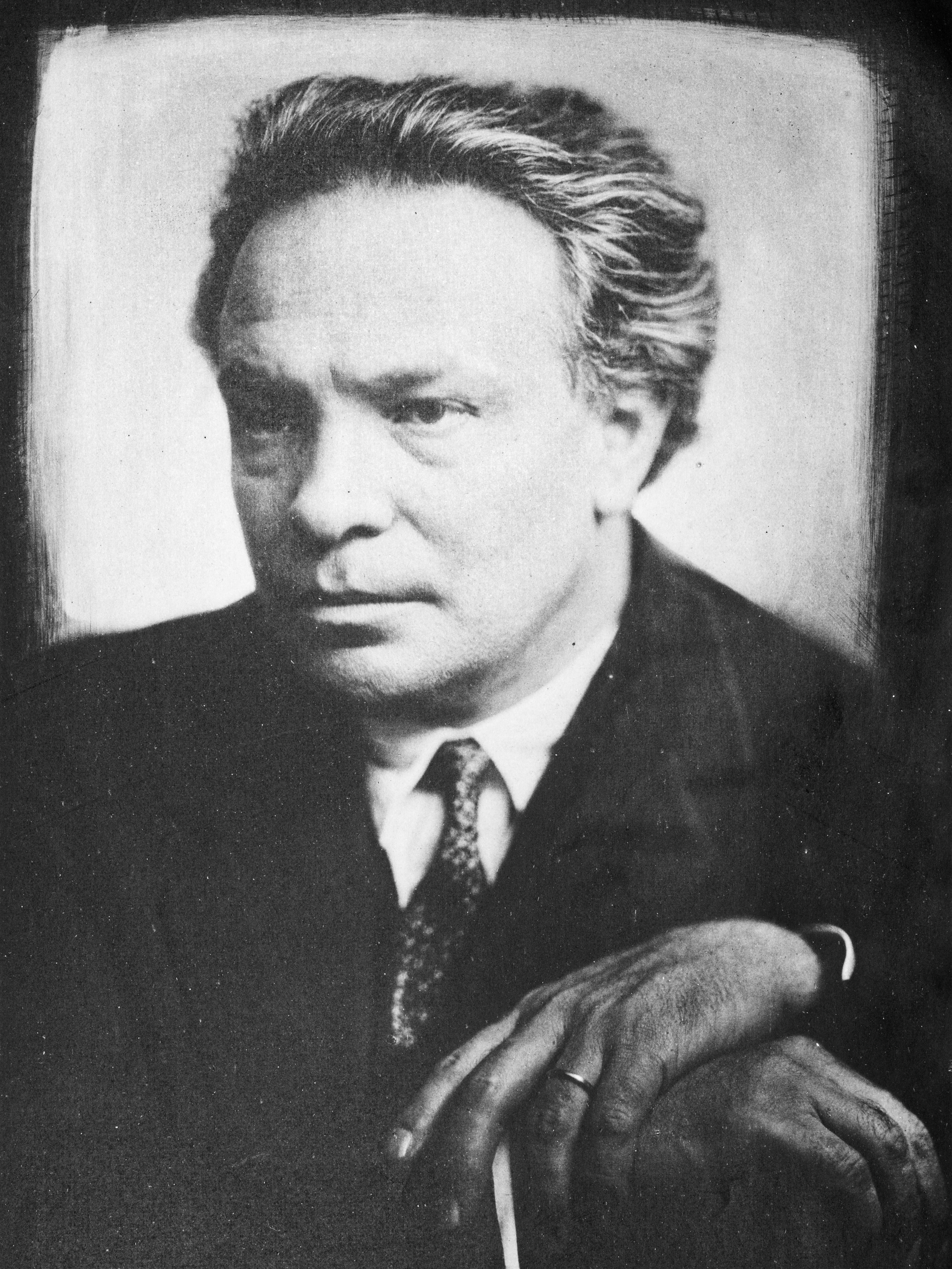
- Respighi in 1927
- Born: 9 July 1879; Bologna, Kingdom of Italy
- Died: 18 April 1936 (aged 56); Rome, Kingdom of Italy
- Resting place: Certosa di Bologna
- Occupations: Composer; conductor; pianist
- Works: List of compositions
- Spouse: Elsa Respighi (m. 1919)

Ottorino Respighi (/rɛˈspiːɡi/ resp-EE-ghee, US also /rəˈ-/ rəsp-; Italian: [ottoˈriːno reˈspiːɡi]; 9 July 1879 – 18 April 1936) was an Italian composer, violinist, teacher, and musicologist and one of the leading Italian composers of the early 20th century. His compositions range over operas, ballets, orchestral suites, choral songs, chamber music, and transcriptions of Italian compositions of the 16th–18th centuries, but his best known and most performed works are his three orchestral tone poems which brought him international fame: Fountains of Rome (1916), Pines of Rome (1924), and Roman Festivals (1928).

Respighi was born in Bologna to a musical and artistic family. He was encouraged by his father to pursue music at a young age, and took formal tuition in the violin and piano. In 1891, he enrolled at the Liceo Musicale di Bologna, where he studied the violin, viola, and composition, was principal violist at the Russian Imperial Theatre, and studied briefly with Nikolai Rimsky-Korsakov. He relocated to Rome in 1913 to become professor of composition at the Liceo Musicale di Santa Cecilia. During this period he married his pupil, singer Elsa Olivieri-Sangiacomo. In 1923, Respighi quit his professorship to dedicate time to tour and compose, but continued to teach until 1935. He performed and conducted in various capacities across the United States and South America from 1925 until his death.

In late 1935, while composing his opera Lucrezia, Respighi became ill and was diagnosed with bacterial endocarditis. He died four months later, aged 56. His wife Elsa outlived him for almost 60 years, championing her late husband's works and legacy until her death in 1996. Conductor and composer Salvatore Di Vittorio completed several of Respighi's incomplete and previously unpublished works, including the finished Violin Concerto in A major (1903) which premiered in 2010.

== Biography ==
=== Early years ===
Respighi was born on 9 July 1879 at 8 Via Guido Reni, an apartment building to the side of Palazzo Fantuzzi in Bologna. The third and youngest child of Giuseppe and Ersilia (née Putti) Respighi, he had a middle class upbringing with his sister Amelia; his brother Alberto died at age nine. Giuseppe, a postal worker, was an accomplished pianist who studied the instrument with Stefano Golinelli and taught music at the Accademia Filarmonica di Bologna. Ersilia came from a family of distinguished sculptors. Respighi's paternal grandfather was a violinist and organist at the cathedral in modern day Fidenza. Amelia described Respighi as closed in nature but sincere, sensitive, and generous.

Giuseppe encouraged his son, but to his initial disappointment, Respighi showed little interest in music until he was almost eight. After being taught basic piano and violin from his father Respighi began formal tuition in the latter, but quit abruptly after his teacher hit his hand with a ruler for playing a passage incorrectly. He resumed lessons with a more patient teacher. Respighi's piano skills were a hit-and-miss affair initially, but his father once arrived home to find Respighi confidently reciting the Symphonic Studies by Robert Schumann; he had learned to play the piece in secret. Respighi remained a self-taught pianist and in later life avoided scales in his compositions due to his inability to play them correctly. Nonetheless he quickly took to other instruments; for example, he taught himself the harp in the course of several days.

In 1891, the family relocated to 2 Via de' Castagnoli where Respighi was able to have his own studio. In his seclusion he collected books and began a lifelong interest in geography, science, and languages. Respighi became fluent, and read literature in eleven languages in his adult life. His wife recalled the composer's meeting with Albert Einstein in Berlin, who was impressed with Respighi's understanding of his scientific theories.

=== Life in Bologna, 1890–1913 ===
In October 1890, Respighi began two years of schooling at the Ginnasio Guinizelli. He enrolled at the Liceo Musicale di Bologna in the following year, studying the violin and viola with Federico Sarti and organ, counterpoint, and fugue with Cesare Dall'Olio. Among Respighi's earliest completed and dated compositions at this time were the Piccola ouverture and Preludio for small orchestra. Four years into his course, Respighi began classes in composition and music history, firstly with Liceo director Giuseppe Martucci and then Luigi Torchi. Martucci, a proponent of Bologna's musical life and composer of non-operatic Italian music, became an influential figure for the young Respighi. In June 1899, he received his diploma in the playing of the violin, performing Le Streghe by Niccolò Paganini in his exam. Not long after Respighi joined the orchestra at the Teatro Comunale di Bologna and played the violin for several seasons.

Respighi in 1903

In the winter of 1900, Respighi accepted the role of principal violist in the orchestra of the Russian Imperial Theatre in Saint Petersburg during its opera season. During this time he met Nikolai Rimsky-Korsakov, a composer Respighi greatly admired, who gave him valuable and influential lessons in orchestration and composition across five months. Further lessons were arranged when Respighi returned to Russia in the winter of 1902 for another series of performances. Respighi finalised his studies at the Liceo Musicale with an advanced course in composition, for which he completed his Preludio, corale e fuga, written under Rimsky-Korsakov's guidance. Performed as part of his final exam in June 1901, the piece was a resounding success. Upon awarding the diploma, Martucci said: "Respighi is not a pupil, Respighi is a master."

In 1902, Respighi travelled to Berlin where he received brief tuition from composer Max Bruch. Despite sources incorrectly stating that he studied with Bruch in 1908, Respighi's wife stated that Respighi in fact did not study with Bruch at all. In 1905, Respighi completed his first opera, the comedy Re Enzo. Between 1903 and 1910, as his local reputation was on the rise, Respighi's principal activities were performing at the Teatro Comunale and as first violinist in composer Bruno Mugellini's touring chamber quintet. He collaborated with various singers, in particular Chiarina Fino-Savio, who performed several of Respighi's songs written for solo voice and piano and set to words by poets Ada Negri and Carlo Zangarini. This included perhaps his most well known, "Nebbie".

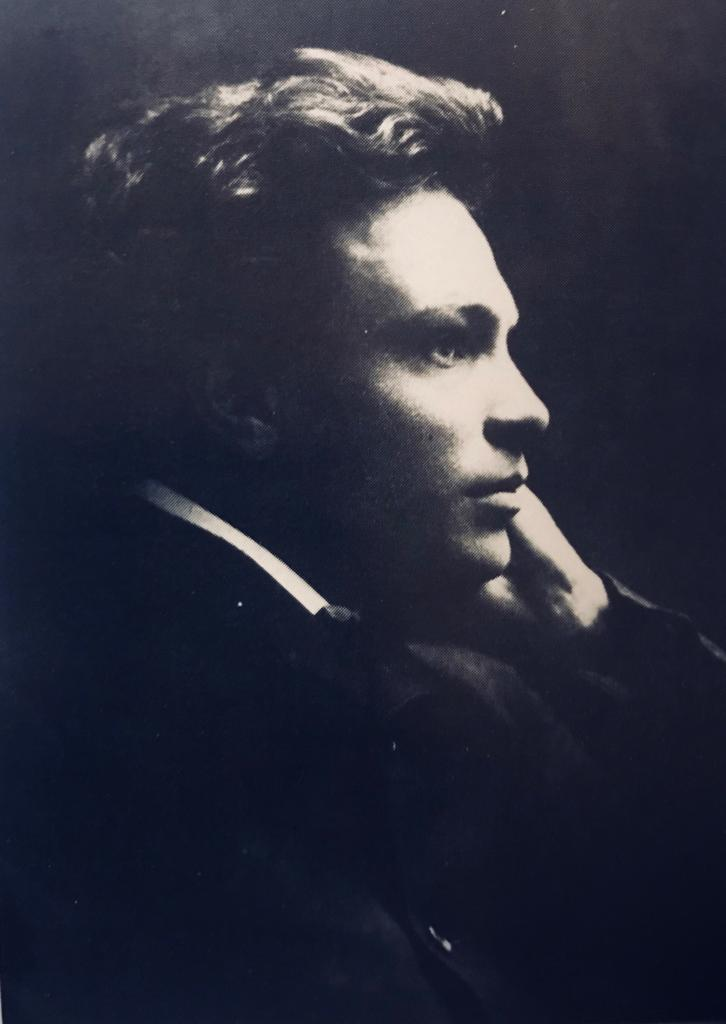
Respighi in 1912

In 1906, Respighi completed his first of many transcriptions of pieces by 17th and 18th century composers. His version of "Lamento d'Arianna" by Claudio Monteverdi for voice and orchestra became his first international success when it was performed during his visit to Berlin in 1908. This second stay in Germany lasted for almost a year, after Hungarian soprano Etelka Gerster hired Respighi as an accompanist at her singing school which greatly influenced his subsequent vocal compositions. Respighi met Arthur Nikisch, then conductor of the Berlin Philharmonic, who arranged to conduct his Monteverdi transcription in concert with famed singer Julia Culp as soloist. Biographer Michael Webb considered this a milestone in the rediscovery of Monteverdi's output, and the critical success of the performance encouraged Respighi to produce further transcriptions of older works. This included two sonatas for viola d'amore and harpsichord from original music by fellow Bolognese composer Attilio Ariosti.

The musical influence from Respighi's time in Germany is discernible in his second opera Semirâma, which marked the first professional staging of a Respighi work. It premiered at the Teatro Comunale in November 1910 to considerable success; two years later, critic Giannotto Bastianelli wrote that the piece marked a transition in Respighi's style from verismo to Decadentism, and praised his use of rich polyphony. Working on the opera, however, left Respighi exhausted. He wrote each individual score by hand to save money and he fell asleep at the post-performance banquet. It is thought that Respighi's inconsistent sleeping patterns throughout his life may have been caused by narcolepsy.

In 1910, Respighi was involved in a short lived group named the Lega dei Cinque (a take on the famous Russian "Five"), which included Bastianelli and fellow composers Ildebrando Pizzetti, Gian Francesco Malipiero, and Renzo Bossi. In the same year he was appointed a member of the Accademia Filarmonica di Bologna. In the next, Respighi replaced Torchi as the teacher of composition at the Liceo Musicale, which lasted until his move to Rome.

=== Life in Rome, 1913–1918 ===
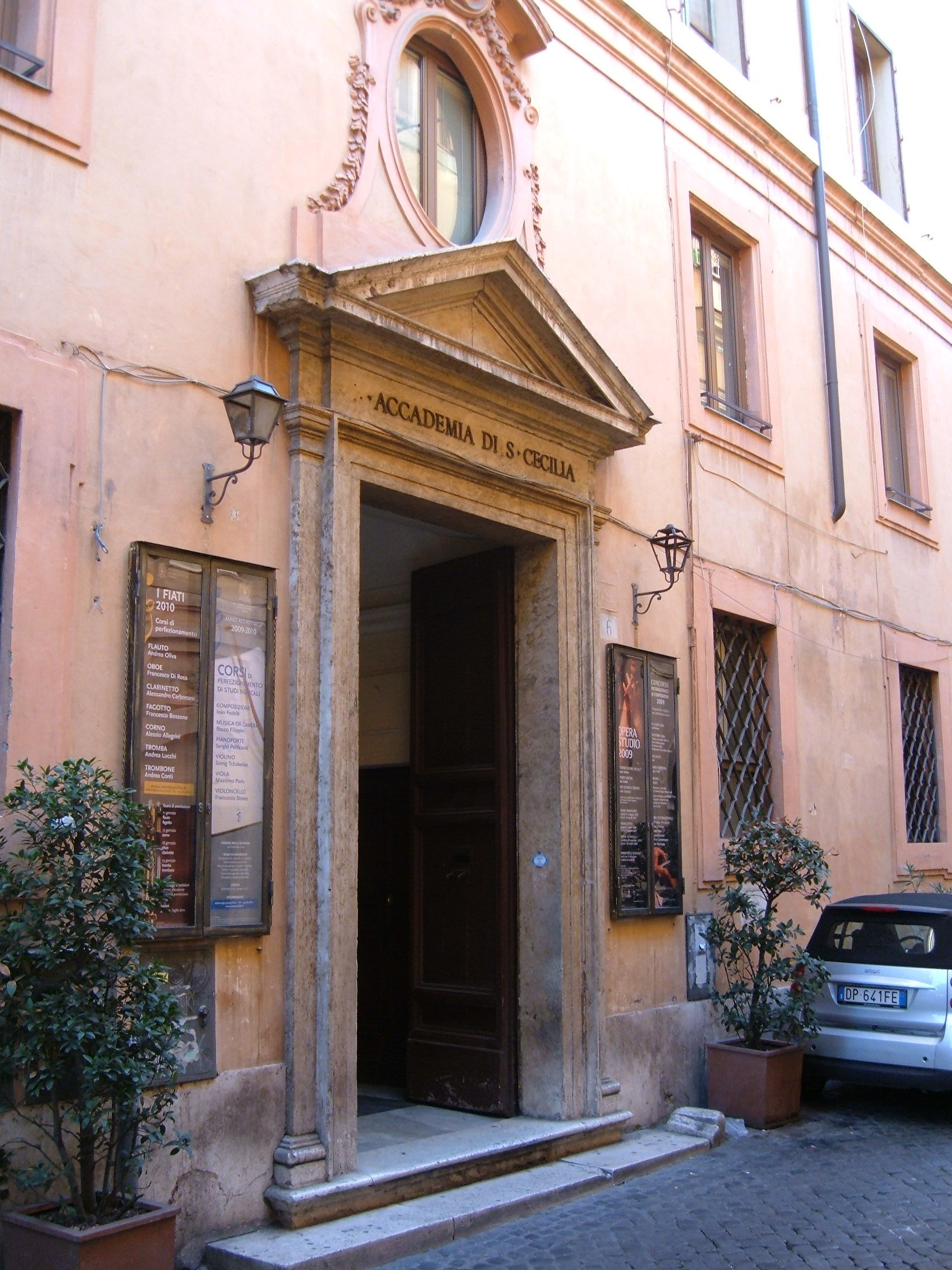
From 1913 to 1935, Respighi taught at the Accademia di Santa Cecilia in Rome

In January 1913, Respighi left Bologna to become professor of composition at the Liceo Musicale di Santa Cecilia in Rome. Among his students during this time were composers Vittorio Rieti, Ennio Porrino, and Daniele Amfitheatrof, conductors Antonio Pedrotti and Mario Rossi, pianist Pietro Scarpini, and organist Fernando Germani. However, the busy and crowded atmosphere of the city unnerved Respighi who found it increasingly difficult to teach and compose. He became withdrawn, homesick, and suffered from irregular sleep.

After a return visit to Germany for several performances in 1913, Respighi focused primarily on teaching. One of his new students in his fugue and composition class was 19-year-old Elsa Olivieri-Sangiacomo; the two started a relationship and Elsa, fourteen years his junior, and Respighi married in January 1919. The pair shared a love for Gregorian chant and Respighi often requested for Elsa to sing monodies to him, sometimes for as long as two hours. From 1921 they lived in a flat in Palazzo Borghese which they named I Pini. Elsa recalled composer Giacomo Puccini saying their marriage was "the most beautiful and perfect thing I know." The Respighis' mutual friend, librettist Claudio Guastalla, said the marriage "functioned on an almost transcendental level of human and spiritual harmony."

In February 1915, publisher Tito Ricordi took an interest in Respighi, who agreed to publish a collection of transcriptions for violin and piano from 1908, namely pieces by Nicola Porpora, Giuseppe Tartini, and Francesco Maria Veracini. In the same year he had a minor involvement in the Società Italiana di Musica Moderna, a group founded in 1915 by Alfredo Casella and other staff members of the Liceo Musicale in an effort to modernise Italian music as a result of Casella's visit to France.

Following Italy's entry into World War I in 1915 the 36-year-old Respighi was eligible for military service, but his position at the Liceo Musicale granted him temporary exemption. Respighi soon entered a low period, for he was deeply saddened by the death of his mother from pneumonia in March 1916. Upon receiving the news of her illness his departure for Bologna was delayed; she died by the time he had arrived. Respighi returned to Rome and resumed work for a brief period until he stopped and went back to Bologna. According to Elsa he spent much of his days in bed, ate little, and refused to see anyone. He recovered in Eremo di Tizzano, a religious retreat in the country hills by Casalecchio di Reno. His short piece for organ, the Preludio, was composed there. In a letter from January 1917 to Fino-Savio, Respighi wrote: "I am alone, sad and sick."

In March 1917 his first orchestral tone poem, Fountains of Rome, premiered at the Teatro Augusteo in Rome. The premiere was originally scheduled in late 1916, but the concert ended early due to the hostile audience reaction to music by Richard Wagner performed in the opening half. Respighi was disappointed with the lukewarm response at the Augusteo, which fuelled his desire to write a more successful follow-up. Following the premiere he toured Italy and Switzerland in another chamber group, this time with Fino-Savio, violinist Arrigo Serato, and pianist Ernesto Consolo. In December 1917 the first of Respighi's three orchestral suites, Ancient Airs and Dances, also premiered in Rome. Each suite features free transcriptions of pieces for lute pieces by various 16th century Italian composers. The sole copy of the full score was somehow lost after the concert, and Respighi was forced to re-write it using the individual parts.

In the summer of 1916 Respighi travelled to Viareggio to meet Russian impresario Sergei Diaghilev, operator of the Ballets Russes. Diaghilev wished to stage La Boutique fantasque, a new production based on the baroque and classical periods. Respighi accepted 1,500 lire to orchestrate the ballet, for which he used piano pieces from Péchés de vieillesse by Gioachino Rossini.

=== Rise to fame, 1918–1925 ===
A turning point in Respighi's career arrived in February 1918, when conductor Arturo Toscanini had asked him to select a composition to be performed in a series of 12 concerts in Milan. He reluctantly picked Fountains of Rome, which had thus far only been performed at its 1917 premiere. The concerts were a huge success and placed Respighi as one of the leading Italian composers of the early 20th century, prompting the start of a longterm, though sometimes tumultuous, relationship with Toscanini. Several months later Respighi secured a deal with Casa Ricordi to publish the work that granted him 40% of the rental and performance rights. Later in 1918 he succumbed to illness with a mild case of the Spanish flu, and entered negotiations to translate and publish Theory of Harmony (1922) by Arnold Schoenberg and a book on counterpoint by Sergei Taneyev, but these never materialised.

In the summer of 1919, Respighi accepted a second commission from Diaghilev for the Ballets Russes: a revised version of Le astuzie femminili by Domenico Cimarosa that concludes with a series of dances based on Russian musical themes, to which Respighi provided new arrangements of the score. The ballet premiered in Paris in 1920. Respighi agreed to produce a score for a revival of La serva padrona by Giovanni Paisiello, which was to also have a Russian connection. He delivered the manuscript in March 1920, one month late. However, Diaghilev had decided against a full stage production and used Respighi's music as part of a series of different songs and dance numbers. The score was considered lost until it was rediscovered 90 years later and performed in its entirety in Bologna in 2014. In 1922, Respighi composed the opera La bella dormente nel bosco for Vittorio Podrecca's puppet company, itself based on the fairy tale "Sleeping Beauty".

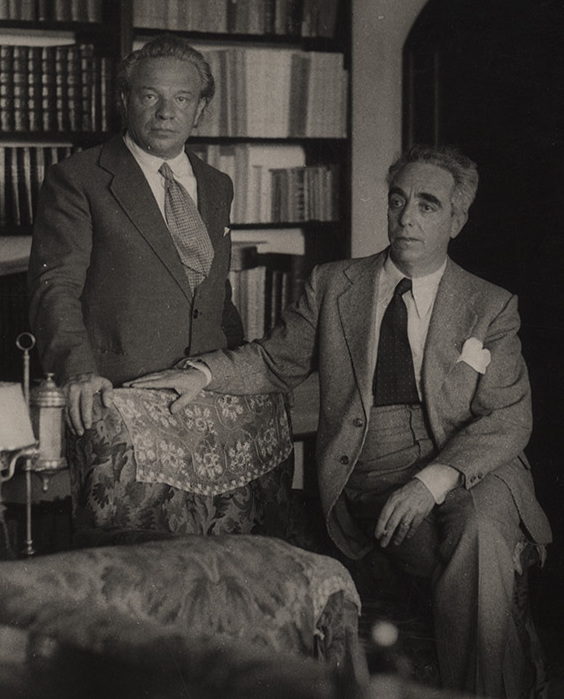
Respighi and Guastalla in 1932

In January 1921, Respighi and Elsa embarked on their first concert tour as joint performers with violinist Mario Corti. It was Elsa's debut as a live performing artist. The tour saw dates across Italy, followed by Prague, Brno, and Vienna. Respighi's employers at the Liceo Musicale were not happy with his extended absence, and sent him a letter suggesting he returned to fulfil his teaching duties for the remainder of the academic year. By 1921, Respighi had begun a lifelong friendship with the writer and journalist Claudio Guastalla, who suggested he compose a new opera and offered to write the libretto. This sparked a period of creativity and Respighi finished Belfagor, his first opera in a decade, without the spells of depression that usually fell upon him after a piece was finished. It premiered in Milan in April 1923. Guastalla produced the libretti for all four subsequent operas from Respighi and influenced the conception, or programmes for, some of his non-operatic compositions.

In January 1922, despite the possibility of further objections from the Liceo Musicale, the Respighis went on a second concert tour, this time in Czechoslovakia. Respighi steered a neutral course towards Benito Mussolini's Fascist government from 1922, and his growing international fame granted him some amount of freedom, but at the same time encouraged the regime to exploit his music for political purposes. Respighi vouched for more outspoken critics such as Toscanini to continue to work under the regime. In 1923, Respighi became the first director of the now state-funded Conservatorio di Santa Cecilia in Rome. He disliked the time-consuming administrative duties the position required and resigned in 1926, but continued to teach an advanced course in composition at the conservatory until 1935.

Six years after Fountains of Rome, Respighi completed the follow-up orchestral tone poem Pines of Rome which premiered at the Augusteo in December 1924. It became one of his most well known and widely performed works. In 1925, Respighi and Sebastiano Luciani published an elementary textbook on the history of music and theory entitled Orpheus.

=== International recognition, 1925–1936 ===
By the mid-1920s, Respighi's growing worldwide fame encouraged the composer to travel extensively, conducting his own pieces, or performing as soloist for his piano compositions. He made his first visit to America in December 1925 to perform and conduct a series of concerts; his first took place at Carnegie Hall on 31 December as soloist for the premiere of his piano and orchestral work, Concerto in modo misolidio. In March 1926, the Concertgebouw in Amsterdam dedicated a series of concerts to Respighi and in 1931, a Respighi festival was held in Belgium.

In May 1927, Respighi and Elsa travelled to Brazil to engage in a concert series of his own music in Rio de Janeiro. The musical style and local customs inspired Respighi, who told the press of his intention to return in the following year with a five-part orchestral suite based on his visit. He did return to Rio in June 1928, but the final piece took form in an orchestral work in three movements entitled Impressioni Brasiliane. In September 1927, Respighi conducted the premiere of his Trittico Botticelliano, a three-movement orchestral piece inspired by three paintings by Sandro Botticelli in Vienna. He dedicated it to American pianist Elizabeth Sprague Coolidge, the patron of the work.

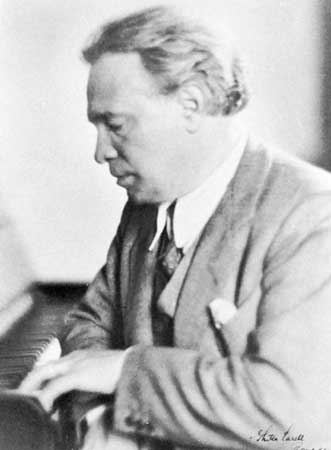
Respighi in 1935

In November 1928, Respighi returned to America for the premiere of his piano and orchestral work Toccata per pianoforte e orchestra at Carnegie Hall, with Willem Mengelberg conducting the New York Philharmonic Orchestra with the composer on piano. By the year's end Respighi completed his third Roman tone poem, Roman Festivals, composed in just nine days. It premiered on 21 February 1929 at Carnegie Hall in New York City with Arturo Toscanini conducting the New York Philharmonic. The Italian premiere followed on 17 March. Having completed the work, Respighi felt that he had incorporated the "maximum of orchestral sonority and colour" from the orchestra and could no longer write such large scale pieces. It was at this time he started to favour compositions for smaller ensembles.

At the end of 1929, Respighi had conductor Serge Koussevitzky forward a proposal to Sergei Rachmaninoff which involved permission to orchestrate a selection of piano pieces from his two Études-Tableaux, Op. 33 and Op. 39. An enthusiastic Rachmaninoff accepted the offer and supplied Respighi with the program descriptions behind five pieces which were previously kept secret. Koussevitzky conducted the premiere of Respighi's Cinq Études-Tableaux with the Boston Symphony Orchestra in November 1931, and noted that Respighi's arrangements were "very good" and demanding of the orchestra which required eight rehearsals. Rachmaninoff thanked Respighi for his work and being faithful to the original scores. Later in 1930, Respighi wrote a commission piece to honour the fiftieth anniversary of the Boston Symphony Orchestra. The result was Metamorphoseon, Modi XII, an orchestral work containing a theme and twelve variations.

In 1932, the Fascist government honoured Respighi with membership of the Reale Accademia d'Italia, one of the highest honours awarded to the most eminent people in Italian science and culture. In the same year Respighi was a signatory in an anti-modernist group that involved several composers, including Pizzetti, Alceo Toni, and Giuseppe Mulè.

From 1933 until his death, Respighi completed no new compositions. Among his final works was Huntingtower: Ballad for Band in 1932, a commission from Edwin Franko Goldman and the American Bandmasters Association in honor of the recent death of composer and conductor John Philip Sousa. Respighi wrote it in six weeks, and based it on a recent visit to Huntingtower Castle in Scotland. It was his only piece scored for a band. Also in 1932, Respighi completed his second concert tour of the US.

Respighi's opera La fiamma premiered at the Teatro dell'Opera di Roma in January 1934, with the composer as conductor. In June 1934, Respighi and Elsa made the month-long voyage to Argentina where Respighi conducted the same opera. This was followed by a visit to Uruguay, where several orchestral concerts were arranged for radio broadcast. Respighi's final completed work was a transcription of Didone, a cantata by Benedetto Marcello.

=== Illness and death ===
By May 1935, Respighi had cancelled several engagements due to ill health, including a scheduled trip to conduct a series of concerts at the Hollywood Bowl in Los Angeles. By November, he had completed a piano draft and the majority of the orchestral arrangements of his next opera, Lucrezia. He had planned to work on a transcription of an opera by Francesco Cavalli that was to be staged alongside Lucrezia during the 1936–37 season at the La Scala in Milan, but declining health caused him to stop work. Neither work was completed in Respighi's lifetime; Elsa finished Lucrezia after Respighi's death with Respighi's former pupil Ennio Porrino, in 1937.

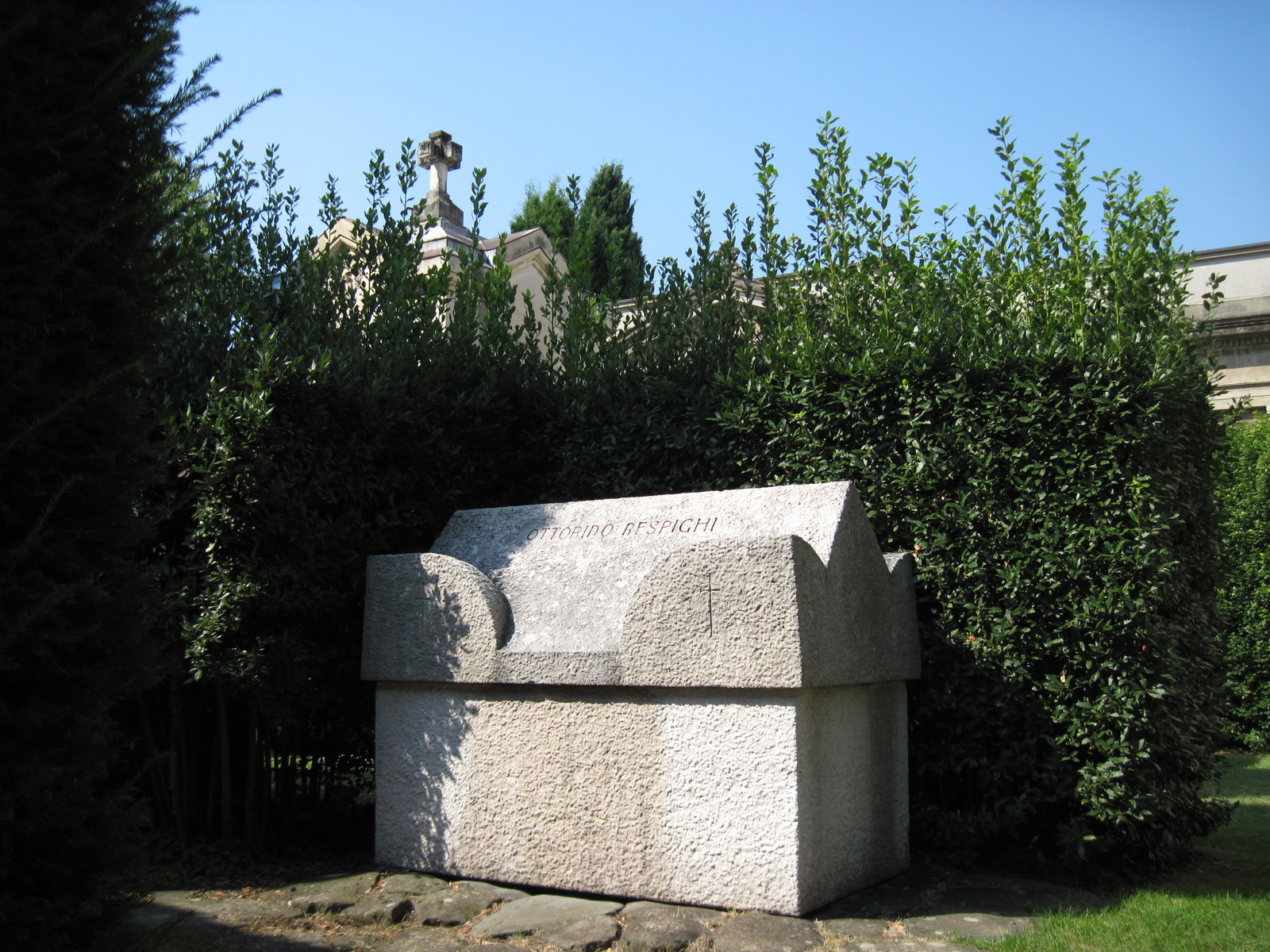
Respighi's tomb

While working on his opera Lucrezia at the end of 1935, Respighi became ill with a fever and fatigue. Subsequent medical checks in January 1936 revealed samples of S. viridans bacteria in his blood, leading to the diagnosis of subacute bacterial endocarditis, a heart infection still untreatable at the time and probably brought on by his recent throat infection and oral surgery. Respighi's health deteriorated over the next four months, during which he received three blood transfusions and experimental treatment with sulphonamides imported from Germany. Elsa made a conscious effort to hide the severity of the illness from others, except for a select few. Respighi died on 18 April in Rome, aged 56, from complications of blood poisoning. Elsa and several friends were by his side. A funeral was held two days later. His body lay in state at Santa Maria del Popolo until the spring of 1937, when the remains were re-interred at the Certosa di Bologna, next to poet Giosuè Carducci and painter Giorgio Morandi. Inscribed on his tomb are his name and crosses; the dates of his birth and death are not given.

== Legacy ==
Elsa survived her husband for nearly 60 years, unfailingly championing his works and legacy. Several months after Respighi's death, she wrote to Guastalla: "I live because I can truly still do something for him. And I shall do it, that is certain, until the day I die." However, Italian governments following Mussolini distanced themselves from nationalistic composers including Respighi, Malipiero, Pizzetti, and Pietro Mascagni, and several Italian newspapers protested against honours bestowed upon Elsa. Nevertheless, in 1961 she donated a collection of unpublished and incomplete manuscripts to the Liceo Musicale and in 1969, helped establish the Fondo Ottorino Respighi foundation at the Fondazione Cini in Venice which included the donation of a large number of letters and photographs. A collection of manuscripts of early works, personal items, and the composer's death mask were also donated to the International Museum and Library of Bologna. Elsa was at the forefront of the Respighi centenary celebrations in 1979 to commemorate the 100th anniversary of Respighi's birth, though it was opposed by what she described as "musical progressives with left-wing political sympathies" who tried to discredit his legacy. The commemoration saw a number of long-neglected works of Respighi's performed and recorded for the first time. Elsa died in 1996, one week short of her 102nd birthday.

In 1993, Swiss conductor Adriano Baumann founded the Respighi Society in London in an effort to make Respighi's "life and works [...] better known and understood by the dissemination of accurate and impartial information." It has since been dissolved. On 4 March 2000, a commemorative plaque was unveiled at Respighi's birthplace on Via Guido Reni in Bologna. His niece Luisa Putti and great-nieces Elsa and Gloria Pizzoli were in attendance; the latter had donated the piano Respighi used to compose Fountains of Rome and Pines of Rome to the Accademia Filarmonica di Bologna in 1956.

In 2006, Elsa and Gloria approached Italian conductor and composer Salvatore Di Vittorio who, along with Respighi archiver and cataloguer Potito Pedarra, commissioned him to complete several of Respighi's incomplete and previously unpublished compositions. This included the Violin Concerto in A major from 1903, which premiered in 2010 with Di Vittorio conducting his Chamber Orchestra of New York. The orchestra continues to premiere ongoing new editions by Di Vittorio of Respighi's music in premieres as well as recordings on Naxos Records. In 2008, Di Vittorio premiered his Overture Respighiana, an orchestral work written as a homage to Respighi.

== Works ==
=== Opera ===
- Re Enzo (1905)
- Semirâma (1909)
- Marie Victoire (completed in 1913, but not produced until 2004)
- La bella dormente nel bosco (1922)
- Belfagor (1923)
- La campana sommersa (1927)
- Maria egiziaca (1932)
- La fiamma (1934)
- Lucrezia (1937) opera in 1 act (completed posthumously by his wife, Elsa, and his pupil Ennio Porrino)

=== Ballet ===
- La Boutique fantasque (1918), borrows tunes from the 19th-century Italian composer Rossini. Premiered in London on 5 June 1919.
- Sèvres de la vieille France (1920), transcription of 17th- and 18th-century French music
- La Pentola magica (1920), based on popular Russian themes
- Scherzo Veneziano (Le astuzie di Columbina) (1920)
- Belkis, Regina di Saba (1932)

=== Orchestral ===
Use of the Phrygian mode on A in Respighi's Trittico Botticelliano (Botticelli Triptych, 1927).

- Fountains of Rome by the New York Philharmonic
  Preludio, corale e fuga (1901)
- Aria per archi (1901)
- Leggenda for Violin and Orchestra P 36 (1902)
- Piano Concerto in A minor (1902)
- Suite per archi (1902)
- Humoreske for Violin and Orchestra P 45 (1903)
- Violin Concerto in A major (1903), completed by Salvatore Di Vittorio (2009)
- Fantasia Slava (1903)
- Suite in E major (Sinfonia) (1903)
- Serenata per piccola orchestra (1904)
- Suite in Sol Maggiore (1905), for organ and strings
- Ouverture Burlesca (1906)
- Concerto all'antica for Violin and Orchestra (1908)
- Ouverture Carnevalesca (1913)
- Tre Liriche (1913), for mezzo-soprano and orchestra (Notte, Nebbie, Pioggia)
- Sinfonia Drammatica (1914)
- Fountains of Rome (1916)
- Part 1 of Suite No. 1 of Ancient Airs and Dances
  Ancient Airs and Dances Suite No. 1 (1917), based on Renaissance lute pieces by Simone Molinaro, Vincenzo Galilei (father of Galileo Galilei), and additional anonymous composers.
- Ballata delle Gnomidi (1919), based on a poem by Claudio Clausetti
- Adagio con variazioni (1921), for Cello and Orchestra
- Concerto gregoriano for Violin and Orchestra (1921)
- Ancient Airs and Dances Suite No. 2 (1923), based on pieces for lute, archlute, and viol by Fabritio Caroso, Jean-Baptiste Besard, Bernardo Gianoncelli, and an anonymous composer. It also interpolates an aria attributed to Marin Mersenne.
- Pines of Rome (1924)
- Concerto in modo misolidio (Concerto in the Mixolydian mode) (1925)
- Poema autunnale (Autumn Poem), for Violin and Orchestra (1925)
- Rossiniana (1925), free transcriptions from Rossini's Quelques riens (from Péchés de vieillesse)
- Vetrate di chiesa (Church Windows) (1926), four movements of which three are based on Tre Preludi sopra melodie gregoriane for piano (1919)
- Trittico Botticelliano (Three Botticelli Pictures) (1927), three movements inspired by Botticelli paintings in the Uffizi Gallery, Florence: Primavera, Adoration of the Magi, and The Birth of Venus. The middle movement uses the well-known tunes "Veni, veni, Emmanuel" and "Tu scendi dalle stelle."
- Impressioni brasiliane (Brazilian Impressions) (1928)

External audio
- Respighi's The Birds with Antal Doráti conducting the London Symphony Orchestra in 1990 at archive.org
- Respighi's Ancient Airs and Dances with Neville Marriner conducting the Los Angeles Chamber Orchestra in 1976 at archive.org

- The Birds (1928), based on Baroque pieces imitating birds. It comprises Introduzione (Bernardo Pasquini), La Colomba (Jacques de Callot), La Gallina (Jean-Philippe Rameau), L'Usignolo (anonymous English composer of the seventeenth century) and Il Cucu (Pasquini)
- Toccata for Piano and Orchestra (1928)
- Roman Festivals (1928)
- Metamorphoseon (1930)
- Ancient Airs and Dances Suite No. 3 (1932), arranged for strings only and somewhat melancholy in overall mood. It is based on lute songs by Besard, a piece for baroque guitar by Ludovico Roncalli, lute pieces by Santino Garsi da Parma and additional anonymous composers.
- Concerto a cinque (Concerto for Five) (1933), for oboe, trumpet, violin, double bass, piano and strings

External audio
- Respighi's orchestral transcription of Bach's Passacaglia and Fugue in C minor, BWV 582 with Pierre Monteux conducting the San Francisco Symphony in 1949 at archive.org

=== Vocal/choral ===
- Nebbie (1906), voice and piano
- Stornellatrice (1906), voice and piano
- Cinque canti all'antica (1906), voice and piano
- Il Lamento di Arianna (1908), for mezzo-soprano and orchestra
- Aretusa (text by Shelley) (1911), cantata for mezzo-soprano and orchestra
- Tre Liriche (1913), for mezzo-soprano and orchestra (Notte, Nebbie, Pioggia)
- La Sensitiva (The Sensitive Plant, text by Shelley) (1914), for mezzo-soprano and orchestra
- Il Tramonto (The sunset, text by Shelley) (1914), for mezzo-soprano and string quartet (or string orchestra)
- Cinque liriche (1917), voice and piano
- Quattro liriche (Gabriele D'Annunzio) (1920), voice and piano
- La Primavera (The Spring, texts by Constant Zarian) (1922) lyric poem for soli, chorus and orchestra
- Deità silvane (Woodland Deities, texts by Antonio Rubino) (1925), song-cycle for soprano and small orchestra
- Lauda per la Natività del Signore (Laud to the Nativity, text attributed to Jacopone da Todi) (1930), a cantata for three soloists (soprano, mezzo-soprano, tenor), mixed chorus (including substantial sections for 8-part mixed and TTBB male chorus), and chamber ensemble (woodwinds and piano 4-hands)

=== Chamber ===
- String Quartet in D major in one movement (undated)
- String Quartet No. 1 in D major (1892–98)
- String Quartet No. 2 in B-flat major (1898)
- String Quartet in D major (1907)
- String Quartet in D minor (1909) subtitled by composer "Ernst ist das Leben, heiter ist die Kunst"
- Quartetto Dorico or Doric String Quartet (1924)
- Tre Preludi sopra melodie gregoriane, for piano (1921)
- Violin Sonata in D minor (1897)
- Violin Sonata in B minor (1917)
- Piano Sonata in F minor (1897–98)
- Variazioni, for guitar
- Double Quartet in D minor (1901)
- Piano Quintet in F minor (1902)
- Six pieces for violin and piano (1901–06)
- Six pieces for piano (1903–05)
- Quartet in D major for 4 Viols (1906)
- Huntingtower: Ballad for Band (1932)
- String Quintet for 2 Violins, 1 Viola & 2 Violoncellos in G minor (1901, incomplete)

=== Books ===
- Orpheus (1926; modern edition: 2020)
