= Violin Sonata in B minor (Respighi) =

1917 violin composition

Violin Sonata
- by Ottorino Respighi
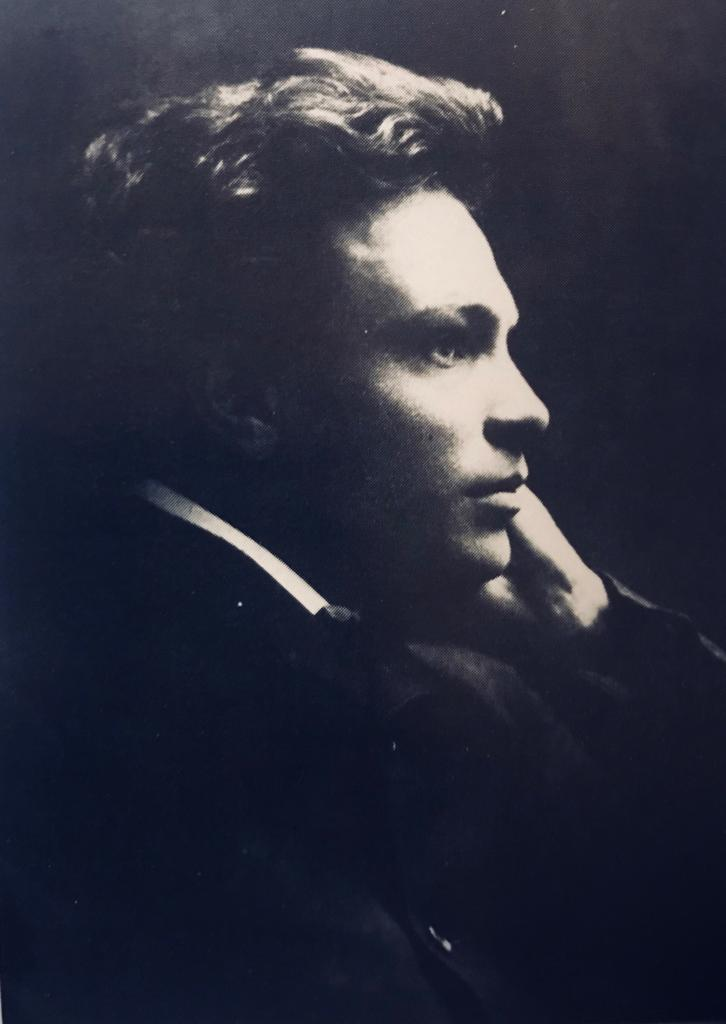
- Respighi in 1912
- Key: B minor
- Catalogue: P 110
- Composed: 1917
- Performed: 3 March 1918 in Bologna
- Published: 1919
- Movements: 3
- Scoring: violin and piano

The Violin Sonata in B minor, P 110, is a sonata for violin and piano by Italian composer Ottorino Respighi, completed in 1917. It is one of Respighi's major large-scale chamber works.

== Background ==
Respighi's Violin Sonata was composed in 1917 and is contemporary with one of his major works, Fontane di Roma. It was premiered in Naples on January 20, 1918, by the violinist Arrigo Serato and the pianist Alessandro Longo. In the same year on March 3, the piece was performed again with Respighi's old teacher Federico Sarti with the violin and Respighi himself at the piano. The sonata was dedicated to Ernesto Consolo and Arrigo Serato and was published by Casa Ricordi in Milan in 1919 and again in 1947, though not without difficulty, as publishers doubted the "performability" of the piece. After its initial publication, the sonata gained international notoriety.

== Structure ==
The sonata is divided into three movements and has a duration of around 25 minutes. The movements are untitled, except for the third movement, which is a set of 20 variations on an ostinato-like accompaniment. The movement list is as follows:

1. Moderato – . = 108 – Agitato – Più vivo – Agitato come prima – Tempo I (Moderato) – . = 104 – Calmo e molto meno mosso
2. Andante espressivo – Appassionato – Poco più mosso – Tempo I
3. Passacaglia. Allegro moderato ma energico – Più mosso – Ancora più mosso – Allegro molto e appassionato – Appassionato e meno allegro – Vivacissimo – Più presto – . = 108 – Più sostenuto (come al principio) – Lento – Andante espressivo – Lento e pesante – Molto allegro e agitato – Largamente – Allegro vivo

The sonata is known for its demanding violin and piano parts and its complex tonal system. Rhythm patterns are also very complex, as time signatures do not always match. For example, the melody in the second movement is first played by the piano in 4/4, whereas the accompaniment has a time signature of 10/8.
