= La fiamma =

Opera by Ottorino Respighi

- Opera by Ottorino Respighi
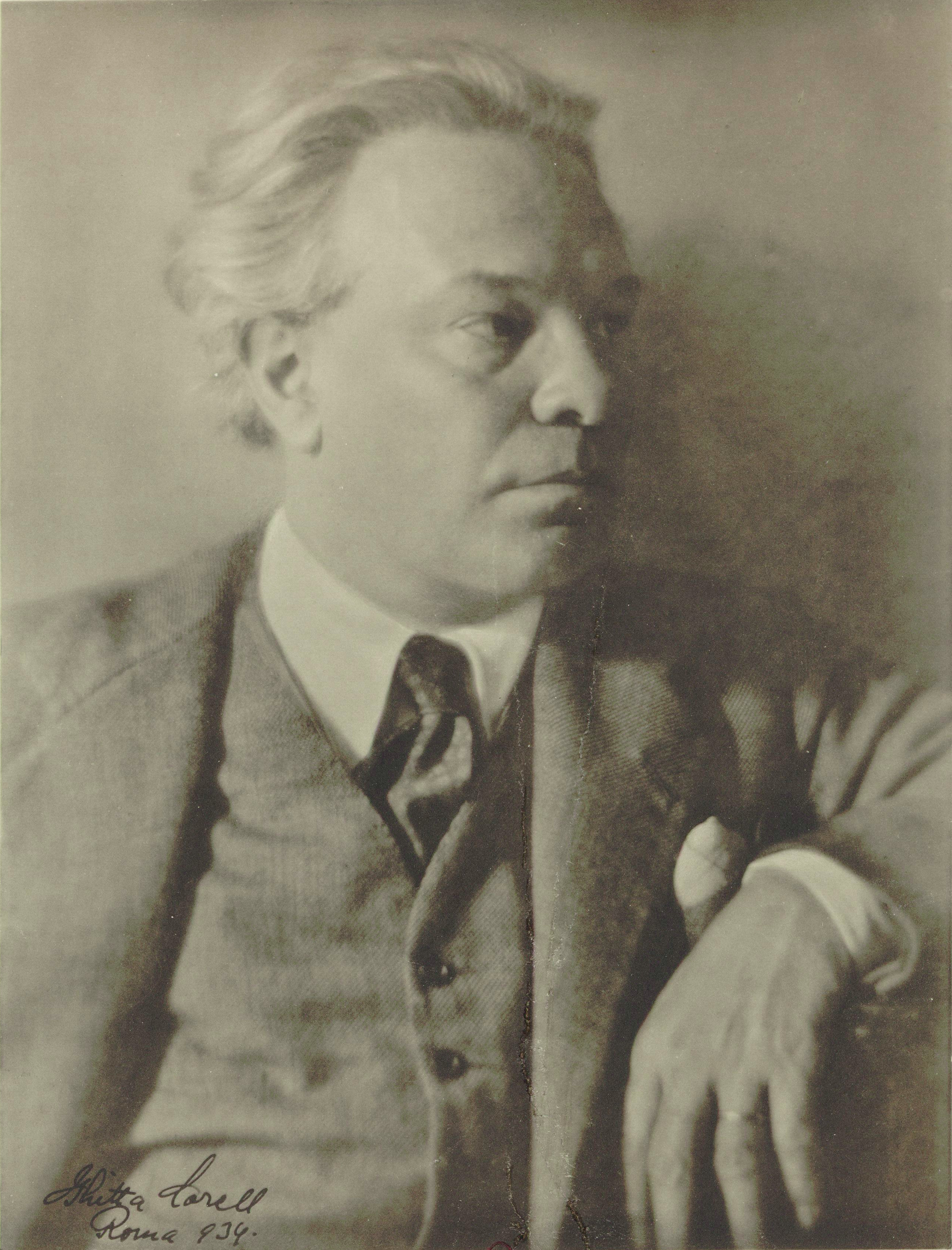
- Respighi in 1934
- Librettist: Claudio Guastalla
- Language: Italian
- Based on: Anne Pedersdotter, The Witch by Hans Wiers-Jenssen
- Premiere: 23 January 1934; Teatro Reale dell'Opera, Rome

La fiamma (Italian: [la ˈfjamma]; "The Flame") is an opera in three acts by Ottorino Respighi to a libretto by Claudio Guastalla based on Hans Wiers-Jenssen's 1908 play Anne Pedersdotter, The Witch. The plot is loosely based on the story of Anne Pedersdotter, a Norwegian woman who was accused of witchcraft and burnt at the stake in 1590. However, Respighi and Guastalla changed the setting of the opera to 7th century Ravenna. The melodramatic tale involves the illicit love of Silvana, the daughter of a witch, for her stepson Donello. When her husband Basilio dies of a heart attack, Silvana is accused of causing his death by witchcraft and is condemned to death. La fiamma premiered to considerable success on 23 January 1934 at the Teatro Reale dell'Opera in Rome in a performance conducted by Respighi himself. The production was directed by Alessandro Sanine with sets designed by Nicola Benois.

After its premiere the work was produced in Buenos Aires and Montevideo (both in Italian) (1934), Budapest (in Hungarian), Chicago (in Italian), and Milan (1935), and in Florence (1938) using a production from Budapest. After the war it was staged again at La Scala (1955), then Rome (1956) and Budapest (1989).

== Roles ==
Roles, voice types, premier cast
Role	Voice type	Premiere cast, 23 January 1934 Conductor: Ottorino Respighi
Silvana	soprano	Giuseppina Cobelli
Donello	tenor	Angelo Minghetti
Basilio	baritone	Carlo Tagliabue
Eudossia	mezzo-soprano	Aurora Buades d'Alessio
Monica	soprano	Laura Pasini
Agata	soprano	Matilde Arbuffo
Lucilla	mezzo-soprano	Giuseppina Sani
Sabina	mezzo-soprano	Giorgina Tremari
Zoe	mezzo-soprano	Anna Maria Mariani
Agnese di Cervia	mezzo-soprano	Angelica Cravcenco
Exorcist	bass	Augusto Romani
A bishop	bass	Pierantonio Prodi
A mother	soprano	Anna Maria Martucci
A cleric	tenor	Adelio Zagonara
A workman	tenor	Augusto Prot
Chorus (SATB)

== Instrumentation ==
La fiamma is scored for the following instruments:

piccolo, 2 flutes, 2 oboes, English horn, 2 clarinets, bass clarinet, 2 bassoons, double bassoon, 4 horns, 3 trumpets, 3 trombones, bass tuba, timpani, bass drum, tam-tam, harp, strings.

== Synopsis ==
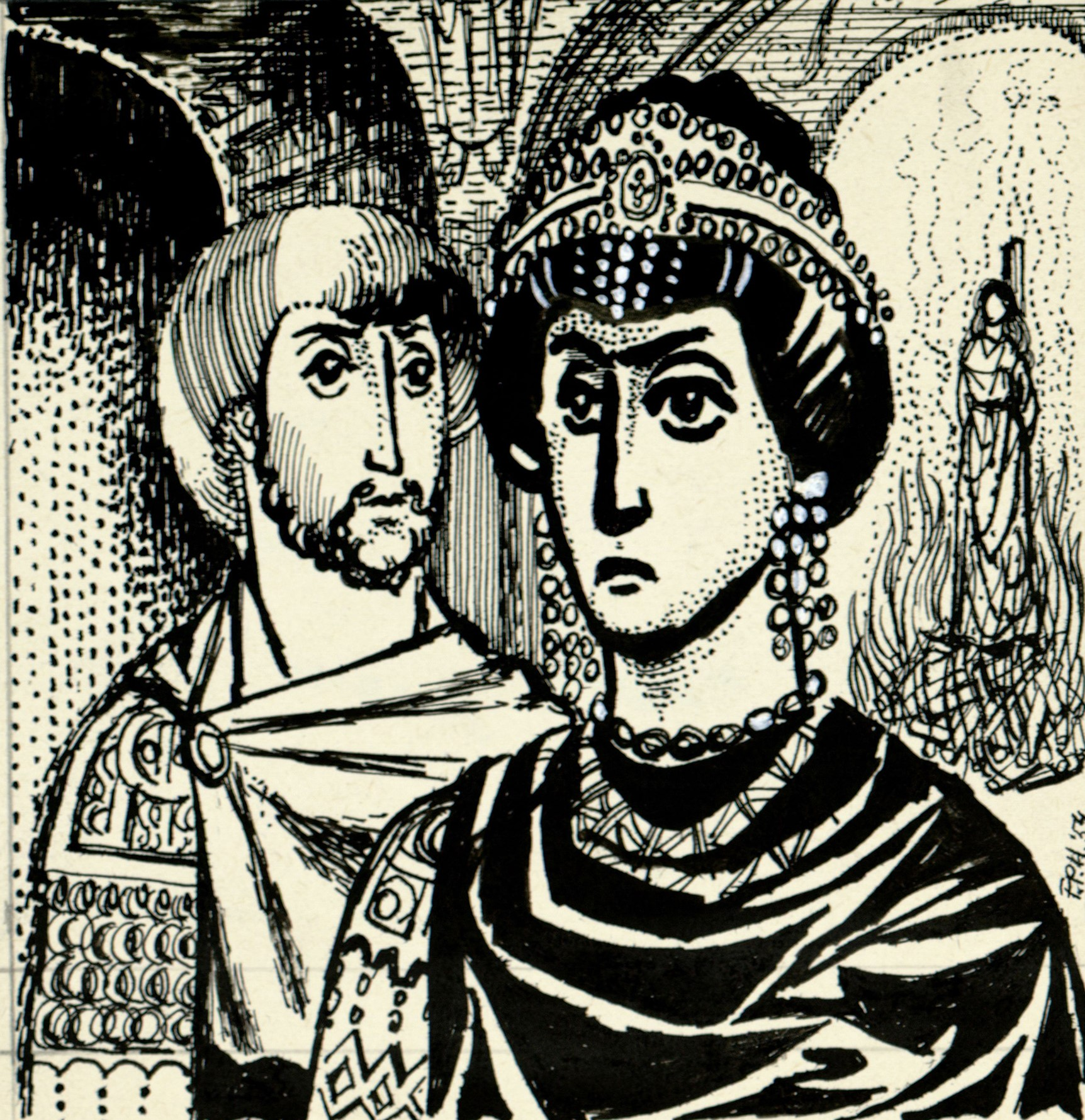
Libretto cover design for La fiamma (1954)

Place: Ravenna
Time: Seventh century AD

=== Act 1 ===
The first act is set in Basilio's summer villa. His aged mother, Eudossia watches while servants and lady in waiting Monica weave, and sing as they work. Eudossia leaves, and the girls talk happily, while the chatter turns to witchcraft. Basilio's young wife Silvana enters and confesses to Monica how sad she feels in the palace. A crowd is heard off-stage in pursuit of Agnese di Cervia, a friend of Silvana's mother, accused of sorcery and infanticide. Agnese appears to Silvana and begs to be hidden. Silvana obliges, and although Silvana tries to make her swear she has no magic powers, Agnese forestalls this.

Basilio's son by his first marriage, Donello, arrives home after many years away and addresses Silvana whom he knew when she was a young girl; Donello and a friend had been led to the house of Agnese to heal a wound. Warm feelings are rekindled between them. On the prompting of Eudossia the house is searched and Agnese is discovered and dragged out. She swears hysterically that she is not guilty but is taken to be burnt.

=== Act 2 ===
Inside Basilio's palace Donello plays with the servant girls. Silvana comes in and challenges Monica about her behaviour, who confesses that she is in love with Donello. Silvana tells Monica that this cannot be, Donello is merely toying with her, and Monica is expelled to a convent.

Basilio and his retinue enter, preparing for war with the Pope. Alone, with Basilio and Donello, Silvana insists that Donello recount what Agnese said before her execution. He affirms that at the stake Agnese had uttered that it was Silvana, whose mother had used spells to make the Exarch wed her daughter, who had concealed Agnese. Basilio furiously says that all who repeat the witch's words will lose their tongue. However, alone with Silvana, Basilio admits that it the words were true – at first he had come under an enchantment, but he now really loved her. Alone again Silvana wonders whether she in fact also has such powers; to test it she whispers 'Donello'... who appears forth. They embrace.

=== Act 3 ===
The first scene in act 3 is in Donello's chamber where he and Silvana sing of their love. They are interrupted by the appearance of Eudossia who guesses the situation. Eudossia holds back Silvana and when Basilio arrives, broken, he bitterly tells Donello that Empress Irene has bade the young man to go back to Byzantium. Donello initially refuses before realizing that he has the chance to break free of his desires, so he makes to leave. Silvana charges Basilio's mother with plotting to separate her and Donello, then claiming that Basilio has denied her a proper life, that she had wished him dead, with which Basilio collapses. Eudossia charges Silvana with sorcery for killing her son.

At the Basilica San Vitale Silvana declares her innocence; Donello asks for her absolution. Eudossia repeats what Agnese had sworn at the stake and insists that Silvana must prove that she is sinless by taking an oath on a religious relic. Abandoned by all, Silvana breaks down and cannot utter the oath; she is condemned. The bishop curses her and the crowd screams "witch!".

== Recordings ==
1955: Francesco Molinari-Pradelli, Orchestra e Coro della RAI di Milano, G. O. P.
Silvana: Mara Coleva; Donello: Giacinto Prandelli; Basilio: Carlo Tagliabue	Eudossia: Lucia Danieli; Agnese: Maria Teresa Mandalari
1985: Lamberto Gardelli, Choir of the Hungarian Radio and Television and Hungarian State Orchestra, Hungaroton
Silvana: Ilona Tokody; Donello: Péter Kelen; Basilio: Sándor Sólyom-Nagy	Eudossia: Klára Takács; Agnese: Tamara Takács
1997: Gianluigi Gelmetti, Teatro dell'Opera di Roma Orchestra and Chorus, CD Agorà (Live recording)
Silvana: Nelly Miricioiu; Donello: Gabriel Sadè; Basilio: David Pittman-Jennings	Eudossia: Mariana Pentcheva; Agnese: Cinzia de Mola
2025: Carlo Rizzi, Chorus and Orchestra of the Deutsche Oper Berlin, (stage director Christof Loy), Bluray, EuroArts
Silvana: Olesya Goloneva; Donello: Georgy Vasiliev; Basilio: Ivan Inverardi	Eudossia: Martina Serafin; Agnese: Doris Soffel
