= Semirâma =

Opera by Ottorino Respighi

- Opera by Ottorino Respighi
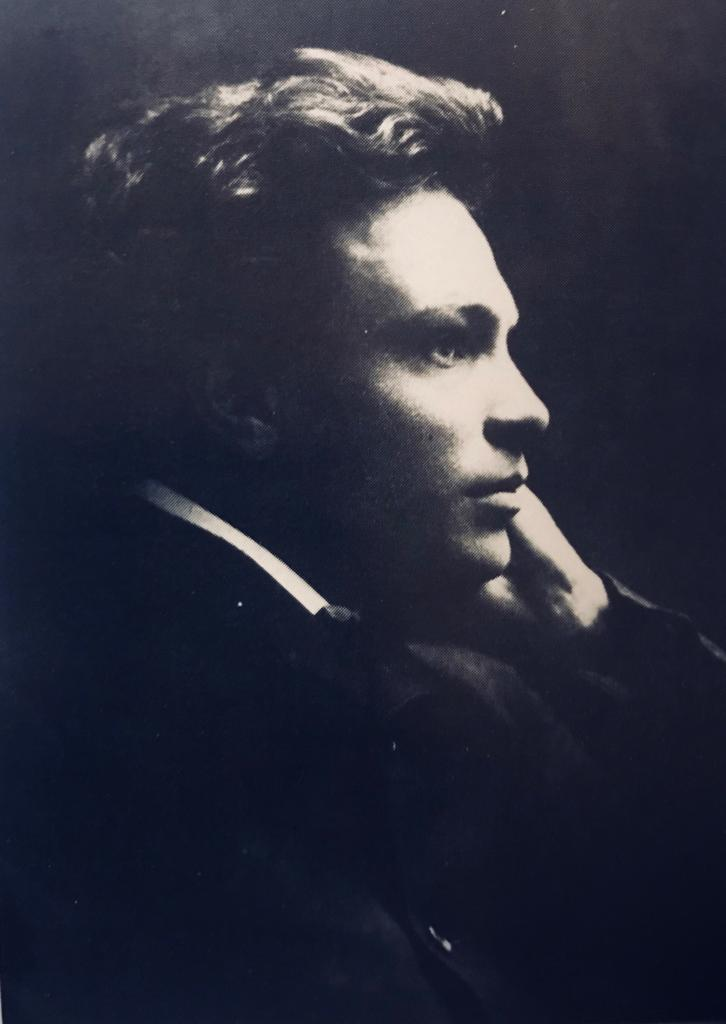
- Respighi in 1912
- Librettist: Alessandro Cerè
- Language: Italian
- Based on: Voltaire's Sémiramis
- Premiere: 20 November 1910; Teatro Comunale di Bologna

Semirâma is an opera in three acts by Ottorino Respighi to a libretto by Alessandro Cerè based on Voltaire's 1748 play Sémiramis, the same subject used for Rossini's Semiramide. Semirâma premiered on 20 November 1910 at the Teatro Comunale di Bologna. The première obtained a great success, with several calls for the composer and the singers.

In this opera, which often exploits the exotic cues offered by the subject, it is possible to find influences of Salome by Richard Strauss.

== Roles ==
Roles, voice types, premiere cast
Role	Voice type	Premiere cast, 20 November 1910 Conductor: Rodolfo Ferrari
Semirâma, Queen of Babylon	soprano	Elsa Bland
Merôdach, Leader of Babylonian armies, Son of Nino and Semirâma	tenor	Giuseppe Borgatti
Falâsar, Tetrarch of Assyria	baritone	Edoardo Faticanti
Susiâna, Chaldean Princess	soprano	Maria Llacer-Casali
Ormus, Wizard in the temple of Baal	bass	Giulio Cirino
Satibara, Priestess in the temple of Baal	bass	Domenico Casadio
First slave of Semirâma	soprano	
Second slave of Semirâma	soprano	

== Instrumentation ==
Semirâma is scored for the following instruments:

piccolo, 2 flutes, 2 oboes, English horn, E-flat clarinet, 2 clarinets, 2 bassoons, double bassoon, 6 horns, 3 trumpets, 3 trombones, bass tuba, timpani, triangle, sistrum, cymbals, celesta, bass drum, xylophone, tam-tam, harp, strings

On stage: 2 oboes, harp, sistrum

== Synopsis ==
Place: Babylon

=== Act 1: The return ===
An unknown but brave warrior, Merôdach, returns home after victorious combats. The queen Semirâma, lover of the tetrarch Falâsar, who several years before to conquer the woman had her husband killed and her son Ninya banished, becomes infatuated with the mysterious hero. Merôdach, after his arrival, meets Susiâna, a woman that was a close friend of his during their childhood. They remind their old friendship, but the passion of Semirâma looms over them.

=== Act 2: The response ===
Falâsar, afraid of losing Semirâma, consults the wizard Ormus. Semirâma announces clearly to Falâsar that she intends to marry Merôdach. Falâsar tries to convince Semirâma that Merôdach is her own son Ninya, returning from exile as a valiant soldier, but Semirâma does not believe him. The response of Ormus is ominous.

=== Act 3: The matricide ===
The wedding between Semirâma and Merôdach is about to take place. Susiâna, informed by Falâsar of the true identity of Merôdach, reveals the story to her old friend. Merôdach thinks this is a slander and tries to kill Falâsar, but in the darkness instead of striking the tetrarch kills his own mother.

== Recordings ==
1990: Lamberto Gardelli, Hungarian State Symphony Orchestra, Hungarian State Radio and Television Chorus, CD Hungaroton Cat. 31197/98

Semirâma: Éva Marton
Susiâna: Veronika Kincses
Merôdach: Lando Bartolini

Falâsar: Lajos Miller
Ormus: László Polgár
Satibara: Tamás Clementis
