= Le astuzie femminili =

- Dramma giocoso by Domenico Cimarosa
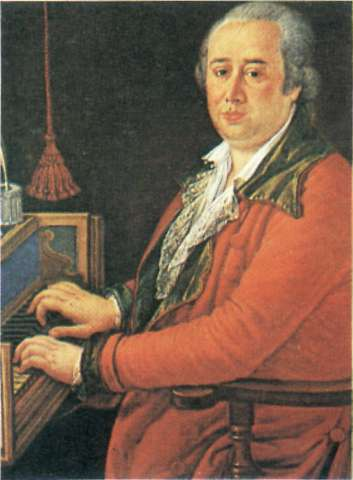
- The composer
- Librettist: Giuseppe Palomba
- Language: Italian
- Premiere: 26 August 1794; Teatro dei Fiorentini, Naples

Le astuzie femminili (Feminine wiles) is a dramma giocoso in four acts by Domenico Cimarosa with an Italian libretto by Giuseppe Palomba. The opera buffa premiered at the Teatro dei Fiorentini in Naples, Italy, on 26 August 1794. The opera was subsequently performed in Barcelona in 1795, Lisbon in 1797, Vienna in 1799, Paris in 1802, and London in 1804, remaining popular during the first quarter of the nineteenth century. Although not performed often today, the opera is still occasionally revived and a number of recordings have been made.

It is at a disappointing London performance of Le astuzie feminili that Stephen Maturin glimpses Diana Villiers, now a kept woman, in Patrick O'Brian's historical novel Post Captain.

== Roles ==
Roles, voice types, premiere cast
Role	Voice type	Premiere cast, 26 August 1794
Signor Lasagna Giampaolo	bass	Carlo Casaccia "Casacciello"
Bellina, pupil of Dottor Romualdo	soprano	Giovanna Codecasa
Dottor (doctor) Romualdo	baritone	Luigi Martinelli
Filandro, in love with Bellina	tenor	Antonio Benelli
Ersilia, Bellina's close friend	soprano	Marianna Muraglia
Leonora, a governess	mezzo-soprano	Luisa Negri

== Discography ==
- 1959: Sesto Bruscantini (Lasagna), Graziella Sciutti (Bellina), Franco Calabrese (Don Romualdo), Luigi Alva (Filandro), Renata Mattioli (Ersilia), and Anna Maria Rota (Leonora); Mario Rossi and the Chorus and Orchestra Sinfonica di Napoli della RAI. Released in 1959 on the Voce label.
- 1984: Nelson Portella (Lasagna), Daniela Dessì (Bellina), Simone Alaimo (Don Romualdo), Michele Faruggia (Filandro), Adele Cossi (Ersilia), and Petra Malakova (Leonora). Massimo de Bernart and the Orchestre du Festival della Valle d'Itria. Recorded live in 1984 and released on the Fonit Cetra label.
- DVD Le Astuzie Femminili Eleonora Bellocci, Martina Licari, Rocco Cavalluzzi, Matteo Loi, Theresia Orchestra, Alessandro De Marchi Dynamic 2024
