= Piano Concerto (Respighi) =

Respighi's A minor (1902) composition

Ottorino Respighi in 1903

The Piano Concerto in A minor by Ottorino Respighi is a concerto for piano and orchestra written in 1902 and published in 1941. The work takes around 20 minutes to perform.

== Structure ==
The concerto is in three movements:

1. Moderato
2. Adagio molto
3. Presto

== Scoring ==
The concerto is scored for piano, pairs of flutes, oboes, clarinets in B♭, bassoons, horns in F, trumpets in B♭, and timpani and strings.
