= Re Enzo (opera) =

Opera by Ottorino Respighi

- Opera by Ottorino Respighi
- Respighi in 1903
- Librettist: Alberto Donini
- Language: Italian
- Premiere: 12 March 1905; Teatro del Corso, Bologna

Re Enzo (King Enzo) is an opera in three acts by Ottorino Respighi to a libretto by Alberto Donini (a student friend of Respighi). Re Enzo premiered on 12 March 1905 at the Teatro del Corso in Bologna. The singers were amateurs selected in the world of the Bolognese students; among them, Rosina Giovannoni Zacchi as Lauretta and Ernesto Lavarello as Leonzio. Following the will of the composer, there was a single performance, which obtained a good success.

Re Enzo is organized as an operetta, with a succession of musical pieces and dialogues.

In modern times, Re Enzo was revived in September 2004 at the Teatro Comunale di Bologna, with Cristiano Cremonini (Re Enzo), Yoon Bin Jung (Lauretta), Filomena Pericoli (Isabella), Giuseppe di Paola (Podestà) and Maurizio Amadori (Gigione). The performance, conducted by Luigi Pagliarini, was presented as a collaboration between various institutions of the city of Bologna (Conservatory, Academy of Arts and University).

== Roles ==
Roles, voice types
Role	Voice type	Premiere cast
Enzo	tenor	Aldo Pelati Stanzani
Lauretta	soprano	Rosina Giovannoni Zacchi
Isabella dei Menicucci	soprano	Carolina Tedeschi
Podestà	tenor	Carlo Musi
Gigione	tenor	
Cucuberna	tenor	
Leonzio dei Ghisilieri	bass	Ernesto Lavarello
Adalberto	tenor	
First worker	tenor	
Second worker	baritone	Giuseppe Pirotti
3 Ambassadors		
Bifolco d'Anzola		Gualtiero Isolani
Students, Guards, Procession, People, Husbands, Women

== Instrumentation ==
Re Enzo is scored for the following instruments:

2 piccolos, oboes, clarinets, bassoons, 2 horns, 2 trumpets, 3 trombones, timpani, triangle, bells, cymbals, bass drum, harp, strings.

On stage: band, trumpets, harps, mandolins.

== Synopsis ==
Place: Bologna
Time: Second half of the 13th century

The story is centered around the figure of Re Enzo, King of Sardinia, captured by the army of Bologna during the battle of Fossalta and held prisoner in the palace later named after him. All women of the city, due to his extreme beauty, fall in love with Enzo and would like to free him. This brings about a conflict with their husbands.
