= Elsa Respighi =

Italian singer and composer

Elsa and Ottorino Respighi in the 1920s

Elsa Respighi (née Olivieri-Sangiacomo; 24 March 1894 – 19 March 1996) was an Italian mezzo-soprano singer and composer. She was the wife and former pupil of Ottorino Respighi. Respighi created a ballet and completed her husband's opera, but also composed a significant number of her own works after his death, including operas and choral works. She published a biography of her husband, and established the Fondo Respighi in Venice to promote music education in Italy.

== Biography ==
Respighi was born Elsa Olivieri-Sangiacomo on 24 March 1894 in Rome. She studied solfege and piano privately, and then from 1905 at the Istituto Nazionale di Musica in Rome. She also studied at the Liceo di S. Cecilia from 1911, where she was taught piano by Giovanni Sgambati, harmony and counterpoint by Remigio Renzi and composition by Ottorino Respighi. She married Ottorino in 1919. From 1916 onwards Respighi published songs, although after her marriage her husband's career took precedence, and she didn't return to composing until after his death in 1936. The couple toured in the US, Europe and South America, where Respighi sang their compositions.

As a mezzo-soprano singer and composer herself, Elsa Respighi created ballets out of her husband's Ancient Airs and Dances suites, and completed his final opera Lucrezia in 1937. Throughout her long life she championed her husband's work unfailingly. In 1955 she produced a memoir of her encounters with some of the most influential cultural figures of the early twentieth century. She also published a biography of Respighi in 1962.

In 1969 she established Fondo Respighi at the Fondazione Giorgio Cini in Venice, to promote music education in Italy. She was also at the forefront of the 1979 Respighi Centenary celebrations, which saw a number of long-neglected works performed and recorded for the first time. Since then, several of her own works, chiefly for solo voice with accompaniment, have been given their premiere. Respighi is considered to have done her most significant work after her husband's death, with the 1938 Il pianto della Madonna, and a number of operas, including one-act opera Alcesti, and the three-act Samurai in 1945.

== Death ==
She died one week before her 102nd birthday in 1996.

== Works ==
Elsa Respighi's works include:

- 3 Canzoni su testi spagnoli
- 4 Liriche dai Rubaiyat
- Berceuse bretonne
- Cantare Campagnolo
- Je n'ai rien
- La Mamma Povera
- Momento
- Duermete mi alma
- La muerte del Payador
- Due canzoni italiane
