= -ana =

English language suffix

-ana (variant: -iana) is a suffix of Latin origin that is used in English to convert nouns, usually proper names into mass nouns, most commonly in order to refer to a collection of things, facts, stories, memorabilia, and anything else, that relate to a specific place, period, person, etc.

For instance, Americana is used to refer to things that are distinctive of the US, while Canadiana is for Canada; in literature, Shakespeareana and Dickensiana are similarly used in reference to items or stories related to William Shakespeare or Charles Dickens, respectively.

The suffix -ana, -iana, or -eana have also often been used in the titles of musical works, as a way for a composer to pay tribute to an earlier composer or noted performer.

== History and lexicology ==
The suffix has been around since at least the 16th century, typically in book titles, with the first recorded use of -ana being between 1720 and 1730.

The recognition of the usage of -ana or -iana as a self-conscious literary construction, on the other hand, traces back to at least 1740, when it was mentioned in an edition of Scaligerana, a collection of table talk of Joseph Justus Scaliger, from around 150 years previously. By that period, Scaliger was described as "the father, so to speak, of all those books published under the title of -ana."

As grammatical construction, it is the neuter plural, nominative form of an adjective. So, from Scaliger is formed first the adjective Scaligeranus (Scaligeran), which is then put into the form of an abstract noun, Scaligerana (Scaligeran things). In Americana, a variant construction, the adjectival form already exists as Americanus, so it is simply a neuter plural (suffix –a on the stem American-); the case of Victoriana (things associated with the Victorian period) is superficially similar, but the Latin adjective form is Dog Latin.

== Derived terms ==
=== Places ===
- Africana — things relating to Africa
- Americana — things relating to the United States
  - Californiana — things relating to the state of California
  - Floridiana — things relating to the state of Florida
  - Hawaiiana — things relating to the state of Hawaii and cultural artifacts of Native Hawaiians
  - Columbiana County, Ohio — named in honor of 15th-century Italian explorer Christopher Columbus, combining his surname with the suffix -iana
  - Columbiana, Ohio — city within Columbiana County which takes its name from the county itself
- Australiana — things relating to Australia
- Canadiana — things relating to Canada
- Europeana — things relating to Europe
- Flandrica — things relating to Flanders
- Filipiniana — things relating to the Philippines
- Kiwiana — things relating to New Zealand
- Rhodesiana — things relating to Rhodesia

=== Literature ===
- Bondiana — items relating to James Bond.
- Dickensiana — items or stories related to Charles Dickens
- Forteana — things related to Charles Fort or anomalous phenomena
- Johnsoniana — the sayings or writings of Samuel Johnson
- Miltoniana — items or stories related to John Milton
- Shakespeareana — items or stories related to William Shakespeare.
- Sherlockiana — a broad term relating to memorabilia and non-canonical works of fiction about or referring to the fictional detective Sherlock Holmes
- Thraliana — the name of a diary kept by Hester Thrale

=== Other ===
- Absinthiana – accoutrements related to absinthe and its preparation.
- Arthuriana — things relating to King Arthur and Arthurian literature.
- Breweriana — collectables associated with a brewery or one of its brands, including beer cans, caps bottles, labels, mats, trays, and taps, as well as bottle openers, tin signs, and neon signs.
- Disneyana — items related to The Walt Disney Company, including collectibles, souvenirs, ephemera, and other items produced and/or licensed by Disney.
- Mozartiana — things relating to Wolfgang Amadeus Mozart.
- Petroliana — collectibles relating to gas stations or the petroleum industry, including such items as old gas pumps, fuel advertisements, enamel or tin signs, oil cans, and road maps. (See also Automobilia)
- Railroadiana (or railwayana) — artifacts of currently- or formerly-operating railways.
- Tobacciana — things relating to tobacco, smoking, and the tobacco industry
- Trumpiana — materials or documents relating to Donald Trump
- Victoriana — items from or related to the Victorian era.

== Usage ==
=== In literature ===
In 1718, Charles Gildon subtitled The Complete Art of Poetry with "Shakespeariana; or the most beautiful topicks, descriptions, and similes that occur throughout all Shakespear's plays."

In 1728, Jonathan Smedley had a work titled Gulliveriana: or a Fourth Volume of Miscellanies, being a sequel of the three volumes published by Pope and Swift, to which is added Alexanderiana, or a comparison between the ecclesiastical and poetical Popes and many things in verse and prose relating to the latter.

In 1842, John Wilson Croker, in reference to Samuel Johnson, published Johnsoniana: or, Supplement to Boswell.

Referring to John Milton, C. A. Moore titled a 1927 paper as "Miltoniana (1679–1741)".

=== In music ===
The suffix -iana, -eana or -ana has often been used in the titles of musical works, as a way for a composer to pay tribute to an earlier composer or a noted performer.

Musical tributes with the suffix -ana, -iana, or -eana suffix
Work	Creator	Namesake
Albeniziana	Joan Gibert Camins	Isaac Albéniz
Bachianas Brasileiras	Heitor Villa-Lobos	Johann Sebastian Bach
Bartokiana	George Rochberg	Béla Bartók
Brahmsiana	Leonard Slatkin	Johannes Brahms
Fantasia Busoniana	John Ogdon	Ferruccio Busoni
Chopiniana	Alexander Glazunov	Frédéric Chopin
Cimarosiana	Gian Francesco Malipiero	Domenico Cimarosa
Ode Corelliana	Salvatore Di Vittorio	Arcangelo Corelli
Debussiana	James Rhinehart	Claude Debussy
Donizettiana	Myer Fredman	Gaetano Donizetti
Dussekiana	Eric Gross	František Xaver Dušek
Frescobaldiana	Vittorio Giannini	Girolamo Frescobaldi
Gabrieliana	Gian Francesco Malipiero	Giovanni Gabrieli
Gershwiniana	Steven Gerber	George Gershwin
Handeliana	Józef Koffler	George Frideric Handel
Ivesiana (ballet)	George Balanchine	Charles Ives
Koschatiana	Ernst Bacon	Thomas Koschat
Lisztiana	Dmitri Rogal-Levitski and Jean-François Grancher	Franz Liszt
Mahleriana	Domenico Giannetta	Gustav Mahler
Mozartiana	Pyotr Ilyich Tchaikovsky	Wolfgang Amadeus Mozart
Mozartiana	Julian Yu	Wolfgang Amadeus Mozart
Nazaretheana	Stephen Whittington	Ernesto Nazareth
Nordraakiana	Johan Halvorsen	Rikard Nordraak
Offenbachiana	Juan José Castro and Manuel Rosenthal	Jacques Offenbach
Offenbachiana	Maciej Malecki	Jacques Offenbach
Paganiniana	Alfredo Casella	Niccolò Paganini
Paganiniana	Nathan Milstein	Niccolò Paganini
Paganiana [sic] (piano four hands)	Charles Camilleri	Niccolò Paganini
Pedrelliana	Manuel de Falla and Roberto Gerhard	Felip Pedrell
Prestilagoyana	Pierre Wissmer	Ida Presti and Alexandre Lagoya
Purcelliana	Alfred Akon	Henry Purcell
Overture Respighiana	Salvatore Di Vittorio	Ottorino Respighi
Rossiniane	Mauro Giuliani	Gioachino Rossini
Rossiniana	Ottorino Respighi	Gioachino Rossini
Sarasateana	Efrem Zimbalist	Pablo de Sarasate
Scarlattiana	Alfredo Casella and Noam Sheriff	Domenico Scarlatti
Schumanniana	Vincent d'Indy	Robert Schumann
Segoviana	Darius Milhaud	Andrés Segovia
Soleriana	Joaquín Rodrigo	Antonio Soler
Stevensonia (orchestral suite, 1917 and 1922)	Edward Burlingame Hill	Robert Louis Stevenson
Straussiana	Erich Wolfgang Korngold	Johann Strauss II
Tartiniana	Luigi Dallapiccola	Giuseppe Tartini
Tchaikovskiana	Myer Fredman, Tasmin Little, and John Lenehan	Pyotr Ilyich Tchaikovsky
Telemanniana	Hans Werner Henze	Georg Philipp Telemann
Thomsoniana	Peggy Glanville-Hicks	Virgil Thomson
Verdiana	Tutti Camarata	Giuseppe Verdi
Viottiana	Luciano Sgrizzi	Giovanni Battista Viotti
Vivaldiana	Gian Francesco Malipiero and Ede Terenyi	Antonio Vivaldi

Other uses in music
Work	Type of work	Creator	Notes
Asturiana (1942)	symphony	María Teresa Prieto	
Canadiana Suite (1964)	album	Oscar Peterson	
Freudiana	rock-opera album	Eric Woolfson	Woolfon's first solo album, named after pioneer psychoanalyst Sigmund Freud.
Frostiana (1959)	musical piece	Randall Thompson	The work involves 7 poems of Robert Frost, whom the piece is named after.
Kentuckiana: Divertissement On 20 Kentucky Airs, for 2 Pianos, 4 Hands (1948)	composition	Darius Milhaud	
Kreisleriana	piano suite	Robert Schumann	The piece is named after the fictional literary character Johannes Kreisler created by E. T. A. Hoffmann.
Symphony No. 4 (1952) - originally entitled Sinfonia shakespeariana	symphony	Gösta Nystroem	
Vincentiana	symphony	Einojuhani Rautavaara	This piece was named in honour of Vincent van Gogh and reuses some material from Rautavaara's earlier opera on van Gogh, titled Vincent.
Gillespiana (1960)	album	Dizzy Gillespie	The album featured compositions by Lalo Schifrin.
Glinkaiana, Medtneriana, and Scriabiniana	ballets		These three ballets were staged in the Soviet Union in the early 20th century, set to music by their respective namesakes: Mikhail Glinka, Nikolai Medtner and Alexander Scriabin.

== See also ==
- Memorabilia
  - Automobilia
  - Militaria
  - Murderabilia
- Composer tributes (classical music)
