= Paganiniana =

Paganiniana can refer to:

- Paganiniana (Casella), an orchestral work by Alfredo Casella based on themes of Niccolò Paganini.
- Paganiniana, a piece for violin consisting of variations by Nathan Milstein on themes of Paganini.

== Other -ana works ==
For a list of other works in which a composer paid tribute to another composer by using their name in conjunction with the suffix -ana, see -ana.
