= Breweriana =

Beer artifacts with a brewery brand name

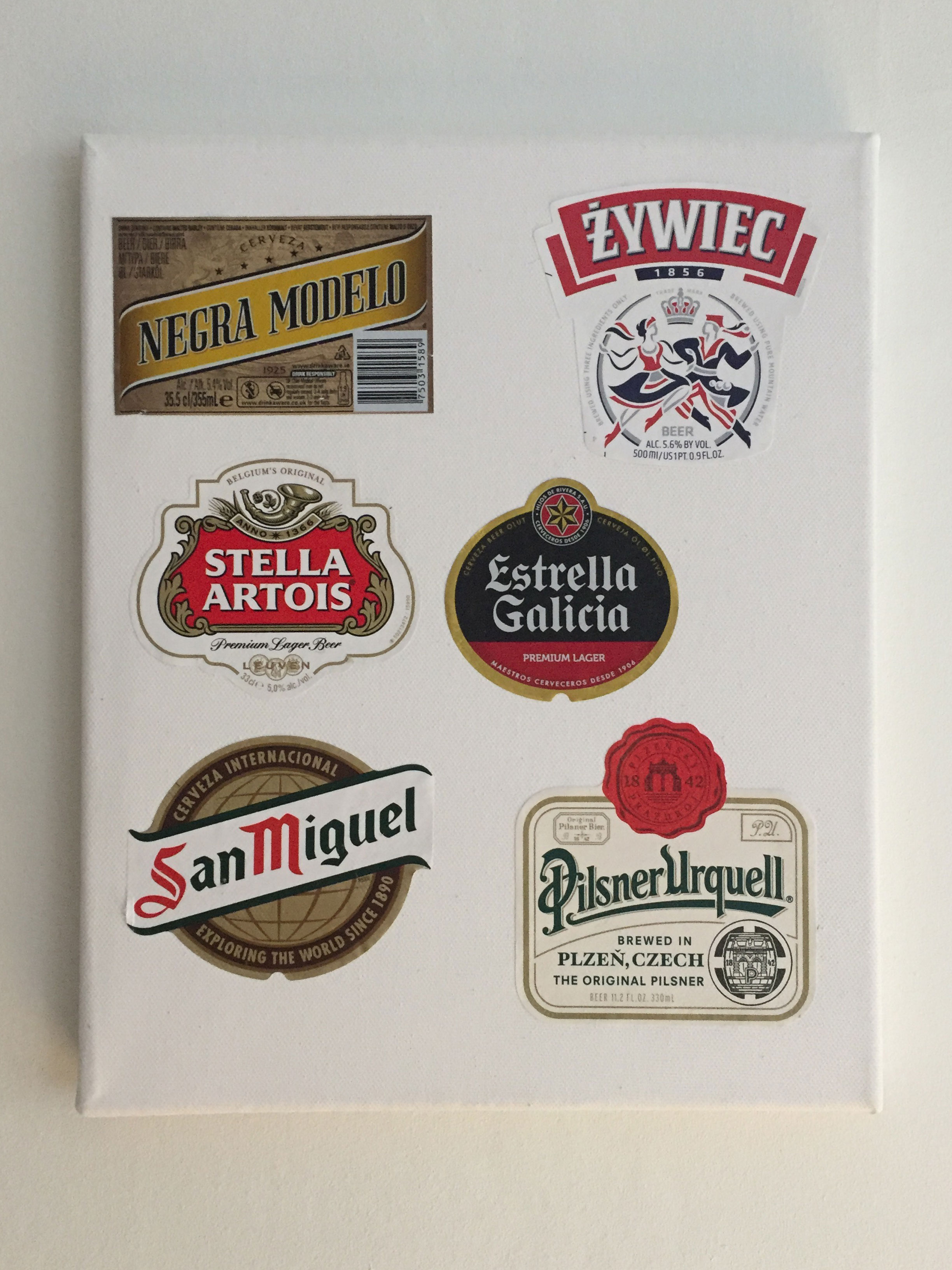
A collage consisting of six beer labels, a typical breweriana item.

Breweriana refers to articles containing a brewery or brand name, such as beer cans, beer bottles, bottle openers, beer labels, tin signs, beer mats, beer steins, beer trays, beer tap, wooden cases and neon signs.

== United States ==
In the US, the National Association of Breweriana Advertising (NABA) was formed in 1972. NABA publishes The Breweriana Collector, a quarterly publication. The term Breweriana is also used by other collector Associations, including The East Coast Breweriana Association and the American Breweriana Association.

The ABA National Brewery Museum & Research Library, at Potosi Brewing Company in Wisconsin, preserves the history of America's breweries with permanent and rotating displays of breweriana, from beer bottles and cans, glasses, coasters, advertising materials and other collectibles.

== World wide ==
The Brewery Collectibles World Convention was formed in Moutfort in 2012 by 16 collectors clubs. Today over 70 clubs are BCWC members.

World Conventions:

- 2013 in Martin, Slovakia
- 2015 in Milwaukee, USA
- 2017 in Tychy, Poland
- 2019 in La Plata, Argentina
- 2022 in Istanbul, Turkey
- 2023 in Lima, Peru
- 2025 in Haguenau, France
- 2025 in Uruguay
