= Beer tower =

Beer dispensing device

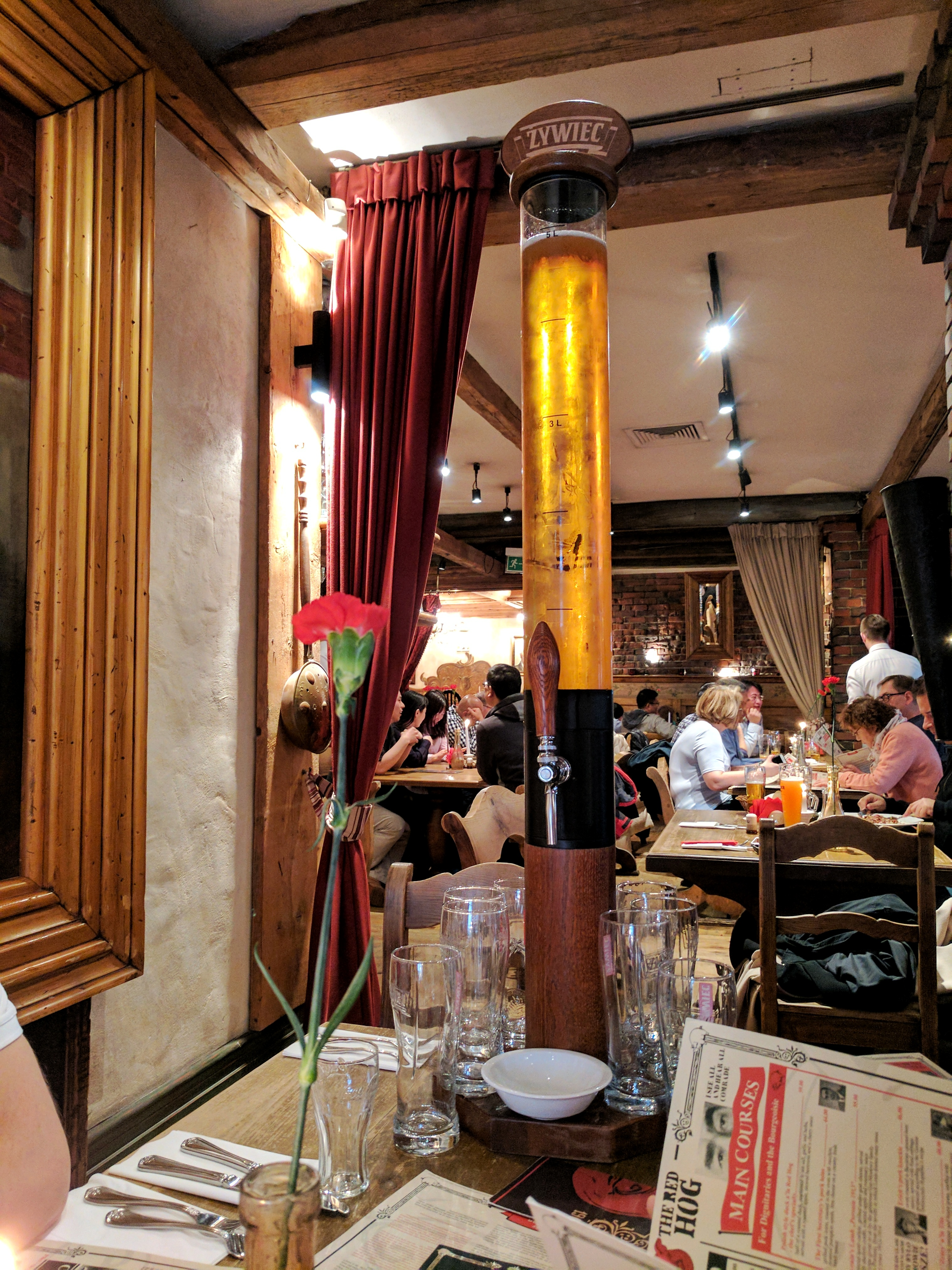
A beer tower in Warsaw, Poland

A beer tower (also known as a portable beer tap, a tabletop beer dispenser, a triton dispenser or a beer giraffe) is a beer dispensing device, sometimes found in bars, pubs and restaurants. The idea behind beer towers is that several patrons in a group can serve themselves the amount of beer they want without having to order individually.

The device comes in a variety of sizes, most often double to triple the size of standard beer pitchers that hold around 48–60 U.S. fluid ounces (1.4–1.8 L) of beer.

Early versions came in the shape of a four-foot tall plastic cylinder attached to a beer tap at the bottom. Current models sometimes have several dispensing valves, to allow for simultaneous dispense.

Chilling of the beer is usually achieved with ice chambers or with freezable ice packs; these are traditionally located internally, but may be external for increased hygiene when handling. The actual dispense mechanism is usually in the form of a simplified beer tap or designed pouring mechanism.

== History ==
The ancestor of the modern beer tower was called a portable keg tap or a picnic tap, since the device was mostly used at outdoor events, such as picnics. They were significantly larger than modern beer towers. The method involved manually pumping air into the beer container; the resulting pressure within the container would force the beer out of the tap. There was also a variant with lager beer barrels that stood upright, allowing gravity to force the beer out of the tap, which is the principle of the modern-day system.

== Usage ==
=== Southeast Asia and Australia ===
The beer tower is popular in bars and clubs throughout Thailand, Malaysia, Singapore, and the Philippines. Since 2012, the beer tower has appeared in Australian bars after first being used in Queensland.

=== United States ===
In March 2011, Boston licensing officials forbade bars from serving beer in beer towers. The officials required licensed alcohol-serving businesses to request permission to use these beverage dispensers.

=== India ===
Self-service tabletop beer dispensers have been in use in India at least since 2017.

== Gallery ==
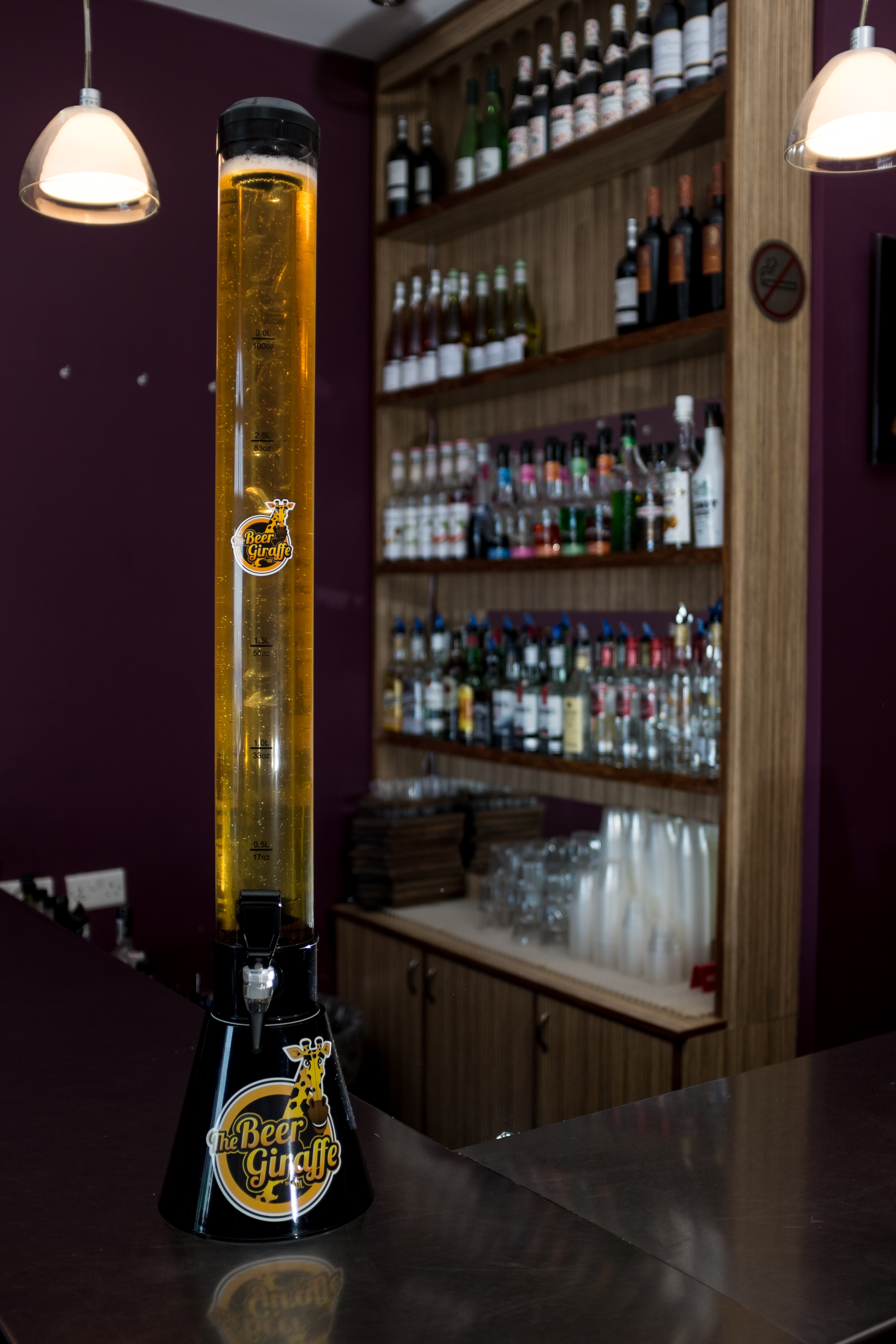
Conic "Beer Giraffe"

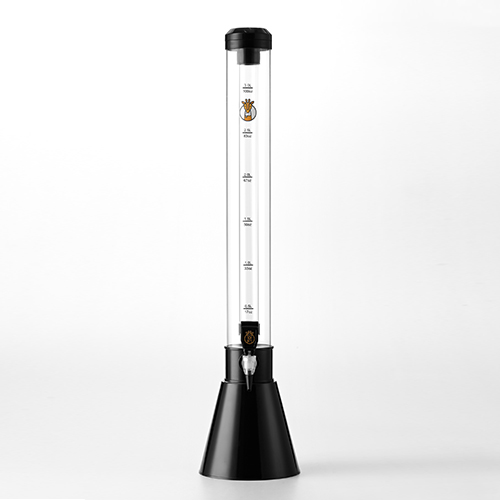
Empty Beer Giraffe dispenser

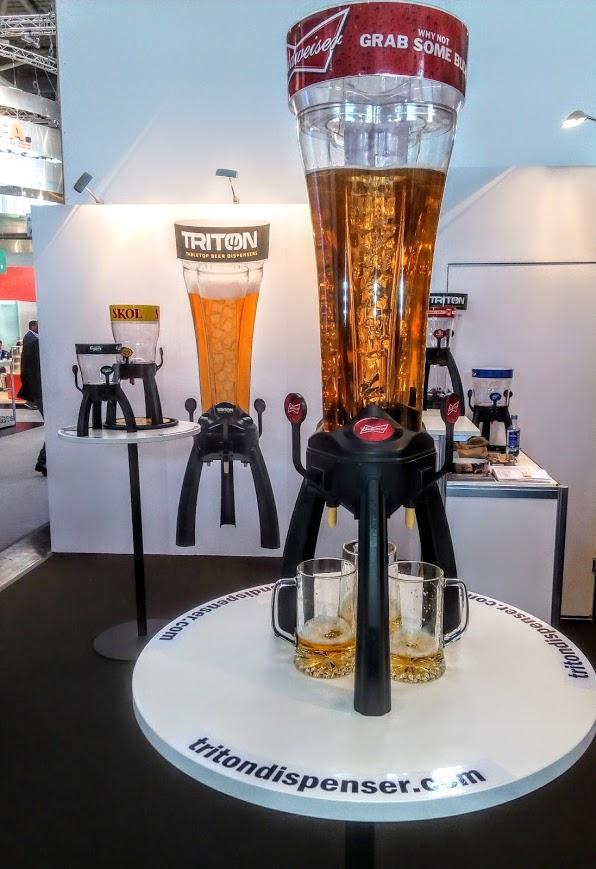
Triple-pour beer tower

== See also ==
- Beer engine
- Beer tap
- Yard of ale
