= Drop catcher =

A drop catcher may be:

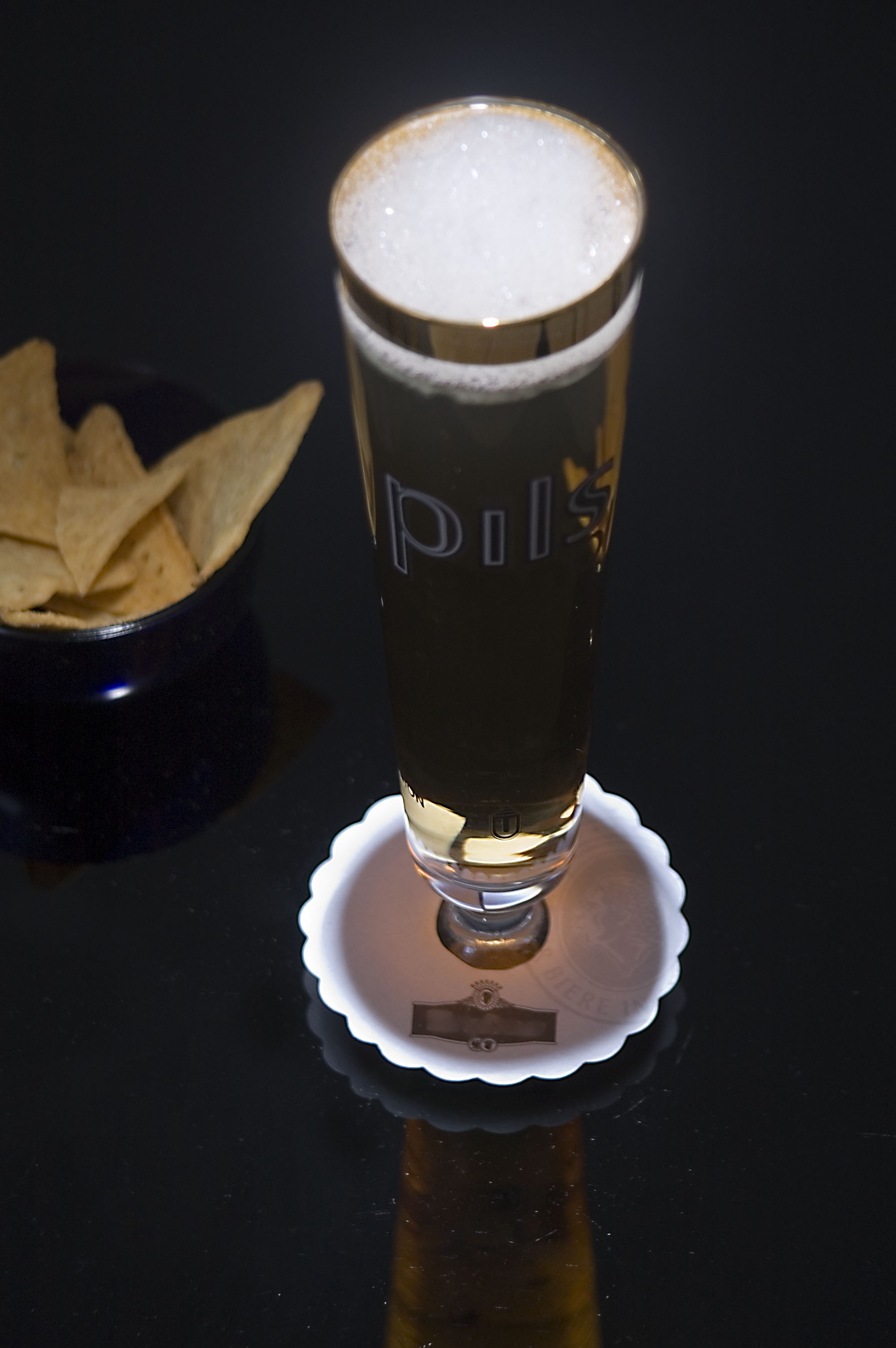
Drop catcher

- A small piece of absorbent paper put on the bottom of a beer glass to prevent its contents from dripping onto the table (not to be confused with a beermat).
- A Domain name registrar who sells dropped names.
