= Concerto gregoriano =

Violin concerto by Ottorino Respighi

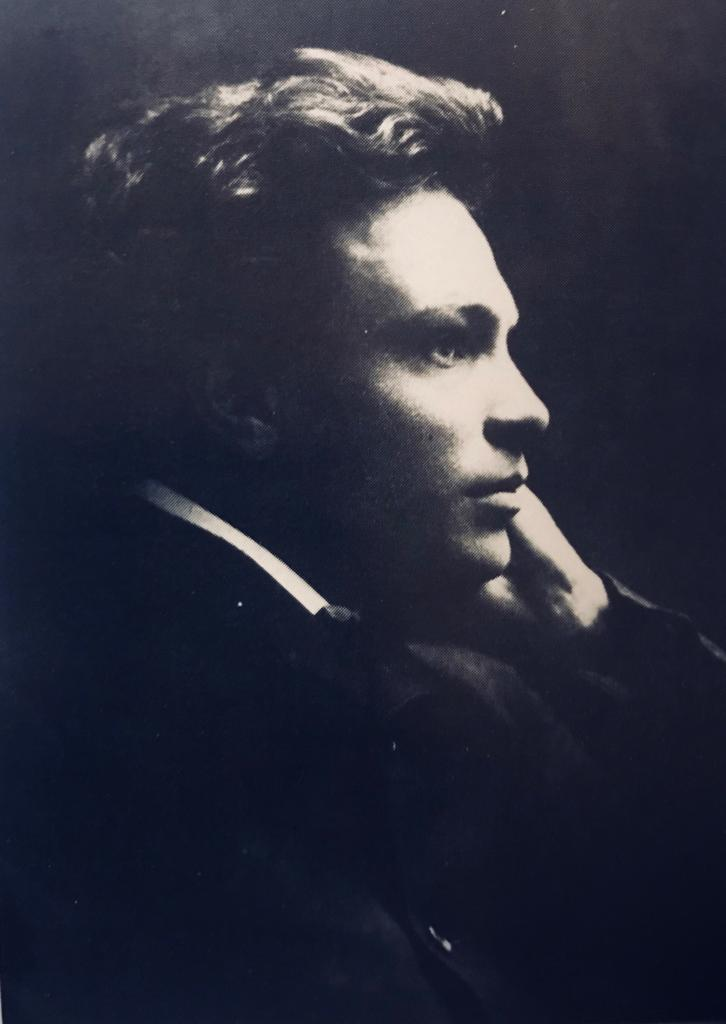
Ottorino Respighi in 1912

The Concerto gregoriano is a violin concerto by Ottorino Respighi. It is inspired by the history and music of early Christianity, such as plainsong and Gregorian chant. It was written in 1921 and premiered the following year in Rome.

== Structure ==
The work is in three movements:

1. Andante tranquillo – Allegro molto moderato – Tempo I – Cadenza (attacca)
2. Andante espressivo e sostenuto
3. Finale (Alleluja). Allegro energico

== Discography (selection) ==
Notable recordings have been made by violinists Lydia Mordkovitch for Chandos, Pierre Amoyal for Decca, Domenico Nordio for Sony Classical, Jenny Abel for Bayer Records, Andrea Capelletti for Koch Schwann, and Takako Nishizaki for Marco Polo.

- Pierre Amoyal with the Orchestre National de France under Charles Dutoit, Decca 0289 443 3242 1 DH.
- Lydia Mordkovitch with the BBC Philharmonic under Sir Edward Downes, Chandos Records CHAN 9232.
- Jenny Abel with the Sinfonia Moldova under Horia Andreescu, Bayer Records BR 100183 CD.
- Andrea Capelletti with the Philharmonia Orchestra under Matthias Bamert, Koch Schwann 3-1124-2.
- Domenico Nordio with the Filarmonica Arturo Toscanini under Muhai Tang, Sony Classical 88765-433872.
- José-Miguel Cueto with the St. Petersburg Symphony Orchestra under Vladimir Lande, Marquis Records MARQUIS81407.
- Vadim Brodsky with the Orchestra Sinfonica di Roma under Francesco La Vecchia, Brilliant Classics 94394 BR.
- Takako Nishizaki with the Singapore Symphony Orchestra under Choo Hoey, Marco Polo 8.220152.

== Adaptations ==
Respighi's Concerto gregoriano was used in a one-act ballet depicting the life of Elizabeth Ann Seton, the first person born in the USA to become a Saint in the Catholic Church. The ballet was created in 2025 to honor the 50th anniversary of her canonization and was entitled "Elizabeth" with choreography by Roman Mykyta and first performed by the Ballet Theatre of Maryland in Annapolis.
