= Orchestra Sinfonica di Roma =

Orchestra based in Rome

Orchestra Sinfonica di Roma is an orchestra based in Rome. It was established in 2002, and is conducted by Francesco La Vecchia.
