= Violin Concerto in A major (Respighi) =

Ottorino Respighi in 1903

The Violin Concerto in A major (in Italian: Concerto per Violino in La Maggiore), P. 49, is the first violin concerto by the Italian composer Ottorino Respighi, which he abandoned in 1903. In 2009, Salvatore Di Vittorio completed it.

== Instrumentation ==
The concerto is scored for two flutes, two oboes, two clarinets in A, two bassoons, four horns in F, two trumpets in A, timpani and strings.

== Movements ==
The concerto is in three movements:

1. Allegro energetico (A major)
2. Molto lento — Agitato — Tranquillo (E major)
3. Allegro rondo (A major)

The second movement is played attacca to the first.

Duration is approximately 21 minutes.

== History ==
The concerto was left unfinished by Respighi in 1903, probably due to his focus on other projects. The work pre-dates the composer's other completed violin concertos: Concerto all'antica in A minor (1908), Concerto gregoriano (1921), and the single movement Poema Autunnale (1925).

The work is mostly inspired by the violin concertos and other orchestral compositions of Johannes Brahms, Antonio Vivaldi, Felix Mendelssohn, Pyotr Ilyich Tchaikovsky and Max Bruch. The middle movement is inspired by the music of Claude Debussy. The influence of Respighi's teacher, Nikolai Rimsky-Korsakov, is also apparent.

Respighi had completed the first two movements of the concerto, and left the introduction of a third movement in piano reduction, with only a few measures orchestrated. In 2007, Respighi's descendants in collaboration with Respighi archive curator/cataloguer Potito Pedarra invited composer/conductor Salvatore Di Vittorio to complete the concerto and edit other early Respighi works, for publication in Italy. Using the autograph manuscripts, Di Vittorio has edited the first two movements, orchestrated the extant (pianoforte) introduction of the third movement, and then completed the concerto following Respighi's vision using rondo form.

Respighi's first Violin Concerto in A major foreshadows his later violin concertos and other orchestral works, including Pines of Rome and Trittico Botticelliano.

== World premiere and recording ==
The concerto received its world premiere with the Chamber Orchestra of New York under conductor Salvatore Di Vittorio on February 13, 2010 at the Church of St. Jean Baptiste in New York. The concerto was recorded for Naxos Records (8.572332).

== Publisher ==
This work was published in 2009 by Edizioni Panastudio in Italy.
