= Chamber Orchestra of New York =

Orchestra in New York City (founded 2006)

- Orchestra
- Former name: Chamber Orchestra of New York – Ottorino Respighi
- Founded: 2006, by Salvatore Di Vittorio
- Location: New York City, U.S.
- Concert hall: Carnegie Hall
- Principal conductor: Salvatore Di Vittorio

The Chamber Orchestra of New York is a professional orchestra founded as the "Chamber Orchestra of New York – Ottorino Respighi" by the Italian composer and conductor Salvatore Di Vittorio. It was established on March 27, 2006, on the 250th anniversary of the birth of Wolfgang Amadeus Mozart, with its debut concert on October 11, 2007, at Carnegie Hall's Zankel Hall as part of the inaugural 2007–2008 season.

== Background ==
The orchestra was modeled after other younger European-style orchestras, and is recognized as one of the first orchestras in the United States to follow this tradition. Its roster is cultivated through live auditions and the ensemble recruits from leading New York and East Coast music conservatories, such as the Juilliard School, Manhattan School of Music, Mannes School of Music, Yale School of Music, and Eastman School of Music, among others. The orchestra performs its annual concert series at Carnegie Hall (in the Weill and Zankel Halls), receives continued international acclaim for it ongoing Naxos Records albums, and has partnered for prominent productions with Morgan Library & Museum, United Nations, Dolce & Gabbana at Lincoln Center, Tory Burch, and Disney for Star Wars.

== Mission ==
"Chamber Orchestra of New York is an ensemble that features a roster of New York city’s musicians. The orchestra is known for championing repertoire that bridges the classical and modern traditions, including film music, through premieres and world premiere recordings of rediscovered masterworks. Through approaches with its programs – from performances to educational outreach – the orchestra aims to reach a broader audience across generations for the future of classical music."

== The orchestra and Ottorino Respighi ==
In 2008, Ottorino Respighi's great nieces Elsa and Gloria Pizzoli, and archive curator/cataloger Potito Pedarra, entrusted music director and Composer Salvatore Di Vittorio with the task of editing, orchestrating, and completing several of Respighi's early orchestral works – such as the first Violin Concerto (in A) – in their first printed, published editions (now) distributed by Casa Ricordi in Milan. The orchestra continues to premiere ongoing new editions by Di Vittorio of Respighi's music in premieres as well as recordings on Naxos Records.

== The Respighi Prize Music Competition ==
The orchestra established the Respighi Prize and Il Premio Respighi Music Competition, for young composers, conductors and soloists in 2010 in collaboration with Comune di Bologna, Italy – Respighi's birthplace.

== New York Conducting Workshop and Competition ==
The orchestra maintains a conducting workshop each spring which offers conductors of all ages and countries the opportunity to reflect, discuss, and refine their podium experiences with veteran mentor conductors. All participants automatically become candidates of the Respighi Prize, and the winner and finalists are offered an opportunity to share the podium in selected concerts.

== Advisory board ==
The orchestra's advisory board developed to include esteemed artists such as film composer Ennio Morricone, conductor Alan Gilbert, and soloists Lynn Harrell, Cho-Liang Lin, and Nadja Salerno-Sonnenberg. Honorary Board members include Respighi family descendants Elsa and Gloria Pizzoli, Respighi archive curator/cataloger Potito Pedarra, and musicologist Luigi Verdi.

== Venues and Productions ==
The orchestra currently performs its Masterworks Series at Carnegie Hall. It also returns with regularity for concerts at Morgan Library & Museum. Over recent seasons, the orchestra has been featured at fashion shows by Moncler, Tory Burch, and Dolce & Gabbana at Lincoln Center.

== Discography ==
- Naxos Records:8.572332. RESPIGHI - Aria, Violin Concerto in A Major (violinist Laura Marzadori), Suite for strings, Rossiniana
- Naxos Records:8.572333. DI VITTORIO - Overtura Respighiana, Sinfonia Nos. 1 & 2, Ave Maria for female choir, Sonata for clarinet (clarinetist Benjamin Baron)
- Naxos Records:8.573168. RESPIGHI - The Birds, Trittico Botticelliano, Serenata, Suite in G for organ and strings (organist, Kyler Brown)
- Naxos Records:8.573530. VAUGHAN WILLIAMS - The Lark Ascending, The Solent, Fantasia for Piano, Six Short Pieces for piano
- Naxos Records:8.573901. RESPIGHI - Concerto all'antica, Ancient Airs and Dances Suites Nos. 1-3 (violinist, Davide Alogna)
- Naxos Records:8.579033. DI VITTORIO - Sinfonias Nos. 3 and 4, Ode Corelliana, Fanfare del Mare, Venere e Adone (Chamber Orchestra of New York)

== Affiliations ==
- League of American Orchestras
- Edizioni Panastudio
- Casa Ricordi
