= Overture Respighiana =

Overture Respighiana is an overture composed by Salvatore Di Vittorio in 2008, as a homage to Ottorino Respighi, one year after completing Respighi's rediscovered first Violin Concerto in A major. The overture received its world premiere from the Chamber Orchestra of New York under the composer, on February 13, 2010, at the Church of St. Jean Baptiste in New York. It was recorded for Naxos Records.

This work was published in 2008 by Edizioni Panastudio in Italy. The duration is approximately seven minutes.

== Instrumentation and duration ==
The overture is scored for two flutes (II Piccolo), two oboes (II English horn), two clarinets in A, two bassoons, two horns in F, two trumpets, three trombones, one tuba, timpani, three percussion (triangle, antique cymbals, glockenspiel, snare drum, tambourine, cymbals, bass drum, and tam tam), celesta, harp, and strings.

== History ==
The overture was composed as a homage not only to Ottorino Respighi, but Respighi's homage works on Gioachino Rossini (La Boutique fantasque and Rossiniana).

The beginning of the overture captures the orchestral sounds of the introduction of Pines of Rome, though with new melodies, simultaneously citing elements of Respighi's Rossiniana. Through fanfares, the music leads to a variation of the March from La Boutique fantasque. A brief sarabande styled interlude is given, inspired from the Valse Lente movement of La Boutique fantasque. The final section involves a tarantella dance in the style of Rossini, which ends with a rocket crescendo.

The overture demonstrates Respighi's influence on Di Vittorio, also through Rossini's influence on the music of Respighi.
