= Salvatore Di Vittorio =

Italian composer and conductor (born 1967)

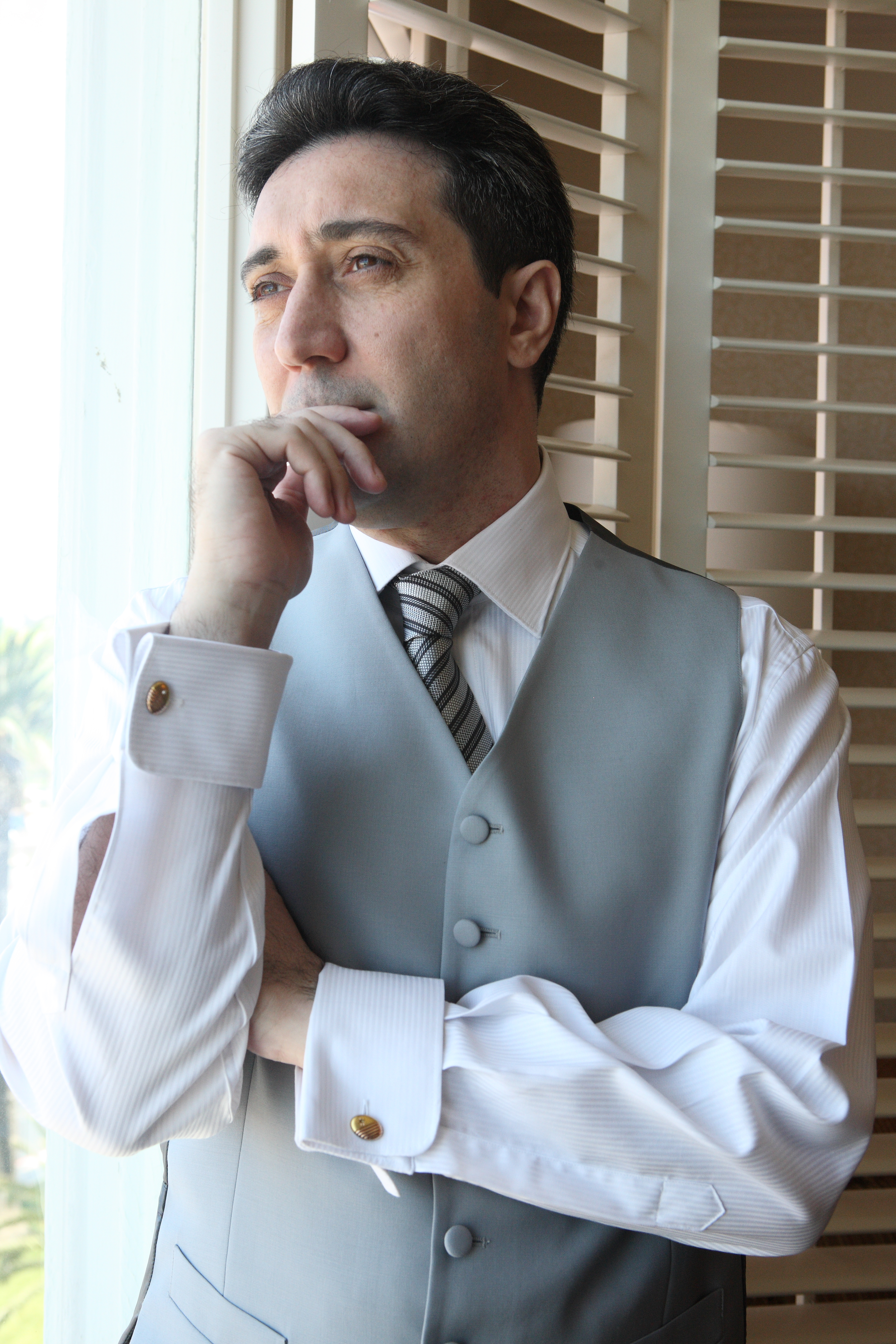
- Salvatore Di Vittorio in 2008

Background information
- Born: 22 October 1967 (age 58); Palermo, Italy
- Occupations: Composer; Conductor (music)

Salvatore Di Vittorio (born 22 October 1967 in Palermo, Italy) is an Italian composer and conductor. He is the Music Director and Composer of the Chamber Orchestra of New York.

== Biography ==
Introduced to music at an early age by his father, Di Vittorio studied composition with Giampaolo Bracali and Ludmila Ulehla at the Manhattan School of Music in New York. He later studied conducting with Giampaolo Bracali, Francesco Carotenuto and Piero Bellugi in Italy.

== Career ==
His program music, focused on symphony and symphonic poems, is mostly influenced by Hector Berlioz and Richard Strauss as well as Maurice Ravel, and Ottorino Respighi. He has worked with orchestras in: Italy (Orvieto, Palermo, Perugia, Florence, Rome), Bulgaria (Sofia), Belgium (Brussels, Ghent), United States (Danbury, Worcester, San Jose, Philadelphia, New York), Canada (Quebec, Vancouver), Egypt (Cairo), Brazil, Switzerland (Basel), Czech Republic (Prague), Austria (Vienna), and the United Kingdom (London).

He has written works for various orchestras, such as Orchestra Sinfonica Siciliana, Chamber Orchestra of New York, Teatro Massimo, San Diego Symphony, Chamber Orchestra of Philadelphia, and The Morgan Library & Museum. Early in his career, Di Vittorio taught at Loyola School (New York City) and Adelphi University.

In 2007, Di Vittorio was invited to edit, orchestrate, and complete several early works of Respighi. This included the first Concerto per Violino (in La Maggiore), published by Edizioni Panastudio and Casa Ricordi in Italy. He premiered and recorded three of these editions, along with his own Overtura Respighiana and first two program symphonic poems with the Chamber Orchestra of New York for Naxos Records in 2010. Naxos Records released these first recordings in 2011.

Other restorations include Respighi's 1908 orchestration of Claudio Monteverdi's "Lamento di Arianna" (from the lost opera L'Arianna, 1608), edited in 2012, and orchestration of Tre Liriche (Three Art Songs, 1913), edited for its centennial anniversary in 2013. In November 2012, Di Vittorio gave the world premiere of his Sinfonia No. 3 Templi di Sicilia in his debut with the Orchestra Sinfonica Siciliana at the Teatro Politeama in Palermo. He composed La Villa d'Este a Tivoli in 2015 for 'The Morgan' on the occasion of its exhibition City of the Soul: Rome and the Romantics. In 2018, Di Vittorio completed his Sinfonia No. 4 Metamorfosi (Metamorphoses).

In June 2021, Naxos released a second album of Di Vittorio's music that includes several recordings, including the new Fourth Symphony. Decca Classics released two recordings in 2021 involving Di Vittorio's published restorations of Respighi's works. The London Philharmonic released a recording of "Nebbie" from Tre Liriche under conductor Renato Balsadonna and tenor Freddie de Tommaso, and the Teatro Alla Scala Opera Orchestra recorded Aria for Strings under conductor Riccardo Chailly.

Between the 2021/2022 and 2024/2025 seasons, Di Vittorio premiered his Viaggi di Enea (Voyages of Aeneas) as one of two commissions for the Teatro Massimo Opera Orchestra in Palermo—the second, his Metamorphosis Symphony at the opera house.

Di Vittorio's works are published by Panastudio in Palermo, under the distributor Casa Ricordi in Milan, Italy. His orchestral works are also listed in Daniel's Orchestral Music Compendium.

== Works ==
The following is a list of works and compositions by Di Vittorio:

=== Orchestral ===
- Americus, per orchestra (2026)
- Carosello (Carousel), per piccola orchestra (2024)
- Enea e Didone, per orchestra d'archi (2023)
- Viaggi di Enea, per violino e orchestra (2022)
- Larchmont Harbor, per piccola orchestra (2021)
- Arie per Enea, per mezzosoprano e orchestra (2020)
- Suite Verdiana, per orchestra (2020)
- Ballo delle Muse, per violino e orchestra (2020)
- Sinfonia No. 4 "Metamorfosi", per orchestra (2019)
- Sarabanda Antica, per orchestra da camera (2018)
- Venere, per flauto, arpa e archi (2017)
- Preludio Sentimentale, per orchestra d'archi (2017)
- Canto Per la Nativita', per piccola orchestra (2016)
- Ode "Corelliana", per piccola orchestra (2016)
- La Villa d'Este a Tivoli, per piccola orchestra (2015)
- Fanfara del Mare (Sea Fanfare) "Su un Tema di Monteverdi", per orchestra (2015)
- Venere e Adone, per piccola orchestra (2014)
- Overtura Palermo, per orchestra (2013)
- Il Tallone di Achille (Achilles' Heel), per piccola orchestra (2010, completed 2013)
- Stabat Mater Speciosa, Per la Nativita', per coro (a cinque) e piccola orchestra (2012)
- Sinfonia No. 3 "Templi di Sicilia", per orchestra (2011)
- Concerto per Violino (in La Maggiore) [Respighi—Di Vittorio] (1903/2009)
- Overtura Respighiana, per orchestra (Based on music of Ottorino Respighi and Gioacchino Rossini) (2008)
- San Michele Arcangelo, per baritono, coro e orchestra da camera (Prologue from opera Fausto) (2005)
- Romanza dal "Romeo e Giulietta", per orchestra da camera (2004)
- Sinfonia No. 2 "Lost Innocence", per orchestra (1997, revised 2000)
- Sinfonia No. 1 "Isolation", per orchestra d'archi (1994, revised 1999)
- Elegy, per orchestra (Movement IV from Sinfonia No. 2) (1996)
- Preludio, per orchestra d'archi (Movement I from Sinfonia No. 1) (1994)

=== Transcriptions and revisions of orchestral music of Ottorino Respighi ===
- Berceuse per archi (1902, edited 2022)
- Violin Concerto "all'Antica" (1908, edited 2019)
- Tre Liriche, per mezzo-soprano e orchestra (1913, orchestration completed 2013) [Version for soprano (or tenore) and orchestra completed and published in 2020.]
- "Lamento di Arianna", per mezzosoprano e orchestra (1908, edited 2012) [Monteverdi—Respighi]
- Serenata, per piccola orchestra (1904, edited 2012)
- Suite in Sol Maggiore, per archi ed organo (1905, edited 2011)
- Suite per archi (1902, revised 2010)
- Aria per archi (1901, transcribed 2010)
- Concerto per Violino (in La Maggiore) (1903, completed 2009) [Respighi—Di Vittorio]

=== Other Transcriptions and Orchestrations ===
- Bolero, per orchestra da camera (2025) (Maurice Ravel (composer)—orchestration by Di Vittorio)
- We Have All the Time in the World, per orchestra d'archi (2020) (John Barry (composer)—orchestration by Di Vittorio)
- Orfeo, Toccata e Ritornello, per orchestra da camera (2017) (Monteverdi—orchestration by Di Vittorio)
- Clair de Lune, per piccola orchestra (2016) (Debussy—orchestration by Di Vittorio)
- O Mio Babbino Caro, per piccola orchestra (2016) (Puccini—orchestration by Di Vittorio)

=== Opera ===
- Fausto, Opera in due atti, per sei solisti, coro e orchestra da camera (Based on Dr. Faustus by Thomas Mann; Libretto in Italian: To be completed)
- Romeo e Giulietta, Opera in due atti, per sei solisti, coro e orchestra (Based on Romeo and Juliet by William Shakespeare; Libretto in Italian: 2003)

=== Choral and vocal ===
- Stabat Mater Speciosa, Per la Nativita', per coro (a cinque) e piccola orchestra (2012)
- San Michele Arcangelo, per baritono, coro e orchestra da camera (Prologue from opera "Fausto") (2005)
- Ave Maria, per coro femminile (1995, revised 1998)
- Magnificat, per coro misto (1995)

=== Chamber ===
- Castelli, per piccolo ensemble (2014)
- Sonata No. 2 "Reflections on a Nursery rhyme", per pianoforte (1996)
- Sonata No. 1, per clarinetto (1995, revised 1998)
