= Gaetano Giuffrè =

Italian-Greek-Swiss composer and maestro (1918–2018)

Gaetano Giuffrè (born Corfu, 14 September 1918 – 8 January 2018) was an Italian-Greek-Swiss composer and maestro whose father was Giovanni Giuffrè, also a composer and maestro born in Corfu, Greece.

== Biography ==
Born into a musical family, Giuffrè began playing violin and piano with his father at the age of 4 until he became an adult at the age of 18.

In 1936, he moved to Athens to study composition with George Sklavos and Dimitri Mitropulos, focusing on fugues and counterpoints. In 1939, he moved to Rome and studied at the Accademia Nazionale di Santa Cecilia where he was one of the students of renown composer, Alfredo Casella. There he acquired formation in choir studies with Elena Mangione and from choir director and influential composer, Goffredo Petrassi.

From 1957 to 1972 he became an artistic director for Radio Svizzera Italiana in Lugano. During this period he received an award by the 8th International Competition G.B. Viotti in Vercelli, Italy for his work, Tema con Variazioni, for one piano. During this period he conducted and performed piano recitals throughout Europe.

In 1957–1961, he was commissioned by the Italian State to direct his work, Aeroporto. The first showing of this work was in 1961 in Bergamo, Italy in collaboration with writer and playwright, Achille Campanile.

Between 1961 and 1970, he continued to give concerts throughout Europe and in parallel composed some big works one of which, Hiroshima, was commissioned by the state of Japan.

Between 1972 and 1975, The Congress of Soviet Composers invited Giuffrè to Moscow for a concert held at the Kremlin where he met the milieu of contemporary Soviet composers: Dmitri Shostakovitch, Aram Khachatourian and Dmitri Kabalevsky. Soon after, he traveled to South Africa to study African percussion.

In 1976 he was awarded a bursary by the Swiss Confederation to write a symphonic study of the sculptural compositions of the late Alberto Giacometti. The composition, Giacometti Introspekt, was written for 52 instruments, mixed choir and percussion.

In 1981, Giuffrè left Europe for Canada where he established himself in Vancouver, British Columbia. In 1984, he directed the Papal visit to Vancouver where he was responsible for preparations and direction of the music and artists. 13 years later, the Foundation Gaetano Giuffrè was created by the Cantonal and University Library of Lausanne where his works can be found in manuscript (more than 150 titles).
