= Yard of ale =

Very tall beer glass

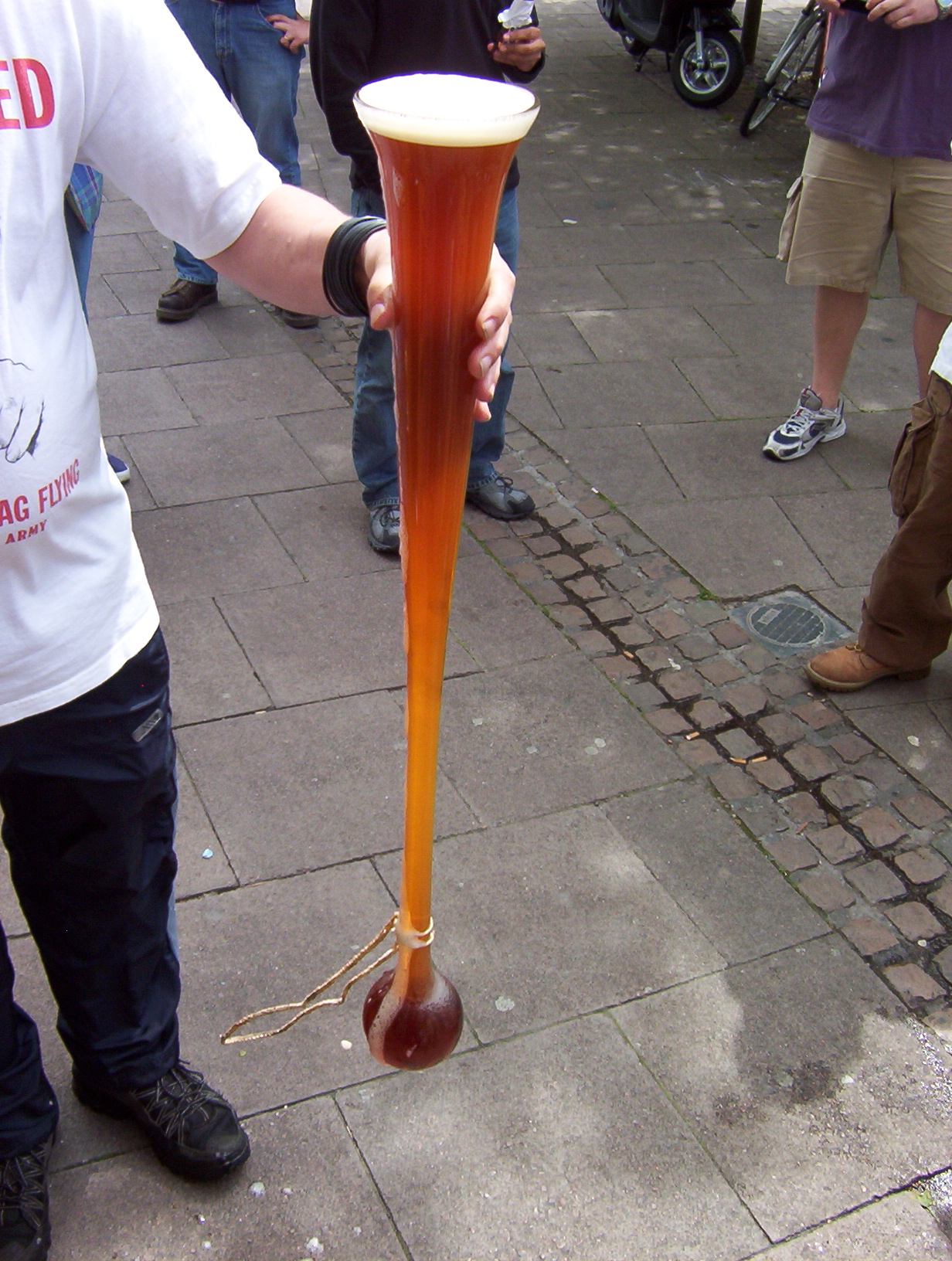
A yard of ale

A yard of ale or yard glass is a tall beer glass used for drinking around 2 1/2 imperial pints (1.4 L) of beer, depending upon the diameter.

The glass is approximately one yard (90 centimetres) long, shaped with a bulb at the bottom, and a widening shaft, which constitutes most of the height.

The glass most likely originated in 17th-century England, where it was known also as a "long glass", a "Cambridge yard (glass)" and an "ell glass". It is associated by legend with stagecoach drivers, though it was mainly used for drinking feats and special toasts.

Drinking a yard glass full of beer as quickly as possible is a traditional pub game; as with the toe of a beer boot, the bulb at the bottom of the glass makes it possible for the contestant to be splashed with a sudden rush of beer toward the end of the feat. The fastest drinking of a yard of ale in the Guinness Book of Records is 5 seconds.

== Description ==
The glass is approximately 1 yard (36 in; 91 cm), shaped with a bulb at the bottom and a widening shaft, which constitutes most of the height. In countries where the metric system is used, the glass may be 1 metre (1.1 yd; 39 in). Because the glass is so long and in any case does not usually have a stable flat base, it is hung on the wall when not in use.

== History ==
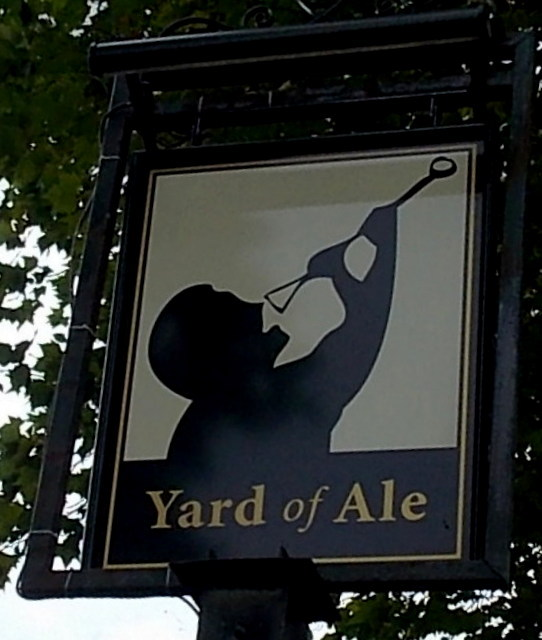
The Yard of Ale pub, Stratford-upon-Avon

The glass most likely originated in 17th-century England, where the glass was known also as a "long glass", a "Cambridge yard (glass)" and an "ell glass". Such a glass was a testament to the glassblower's skill as much as the drinker's. John Evelyn records in his Diary the formal yet festive drinking of a yard of ale toast to James II at Bromley in Kent (now southeast London), in 1685.

Yard glasses can be found hanging on the walls of some English pubs, and there are a number of pubs named The Yard of Ale throughout the country.

== Usage ==
Drinking a yard glass full of beer is a traditional pub game in the UK. Some ancient colleges at Oxford University have sconcing forfeits. While it is popularly said that former Australian Prime Minister Bob Hawke was previously the world record holder for the fastest drinking of a yard of beer, Hawke did not set a world beer drinking record. The record he set was a minor record for students of University College, while much faster records were set elsewhere by other people.

In New Zealand, where it is referred to as a "yardie", drinking a yard glass full of beer is traditionally performed at a 21st birthday by the celebrated person.

== See also ==
- Beer tower
- Drinking horn
