= Giuseppe Martucci =

Italian composer

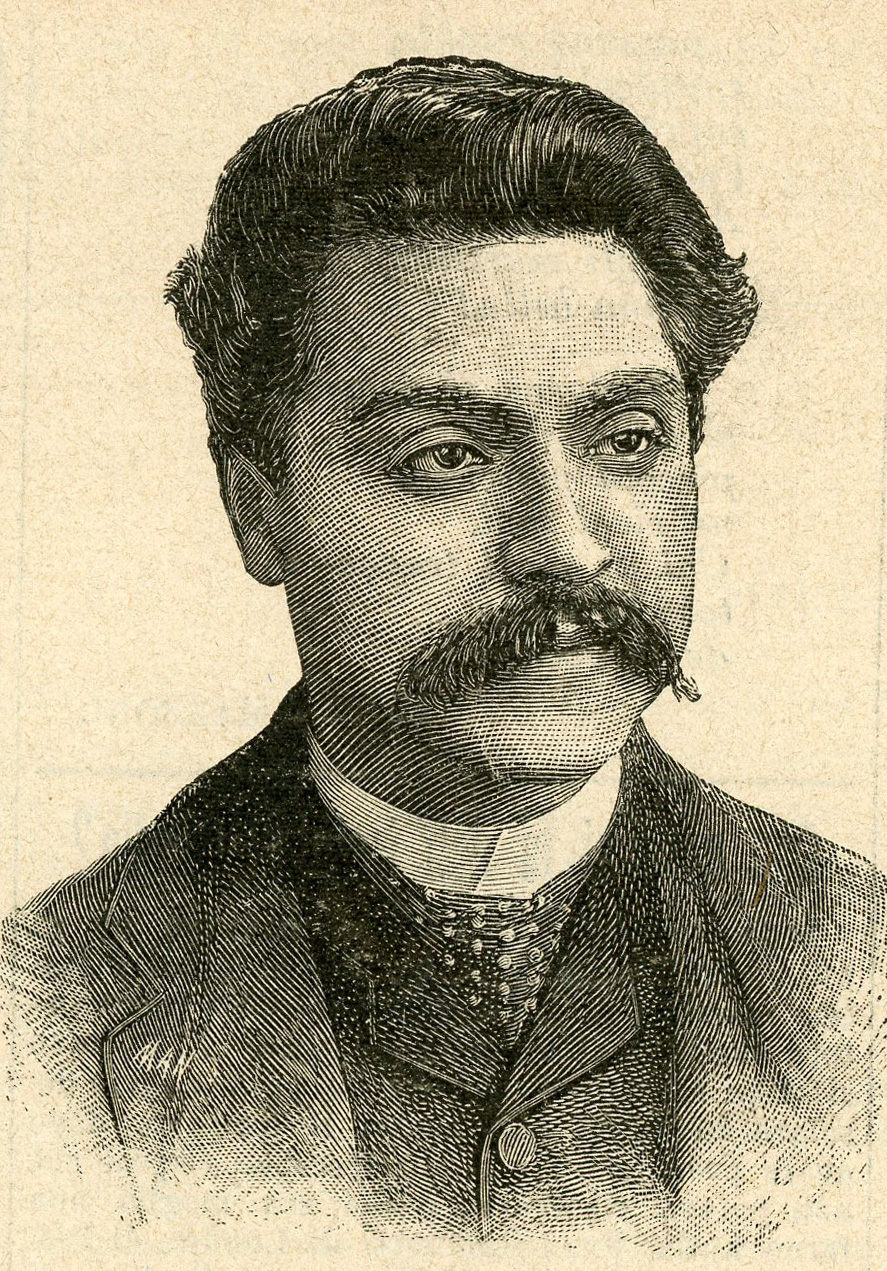
- Born: 6 January 1856; Capua, Kingdom of the Two Sicilies
- Died: 1 June 1909 (aged 53); Naples, Kingdom of Italy
- Occupations: Composer; conductor; pianist

Giuseppe Martucci (Italian pronunciation: [dʒuˈzɛppe marˈtuttʃi]; 6 January 1856, in Capua – 1 June 1909, in Naples) was an Italian composer, conductor, pianist and teacher. Sometimes called "the Italian Brahms", Martucci was notable among Italian composers of the era in that he dedicated his entire career to absolute music, and wrote no operas. As a composer and teacher he was influential in reviving Italian interest in non-operatic music. Nevertheless, as a conductor, he did help to introduce Wagner's operas to Italy and also gave important early concerts of British music there.

== Career ==
Martucci was born at Capua, in Campania. He learned the basics of music from his father, Gaetano, who played the trumpet. A child prodigy, he played in public on the piano when only eight years old. From the age of 11, he was a student at the Naples Conservatory, on the recommendation of professor Beniamino Cesi, the latter being a former student of Sigismond Thalberg. From Paolo Serrao, Martucci acquired his initial training in composition; his own composition students later on, when he worked and taught at Bologna, included Ottorino Respighi.

He died in Naples in 1909. His son Paolo, born in Naples in 1883, also became a pianist of note, briefly teaching at the Cincinnati Conservatory.

=== Pianist ===
Martucci's career as an international pianist commenced with a tour through Germany, France and England in 1875, at the age of 19. He was appointed piano professor at the Naples Conservatory in 1880, where one of his pupils was film score composer Louis De Francesco. He moved to Bologna in 1886, replacing Luigi Mancinelli at the Bologna Conservatory; in 1902 he returned for the last time to Naples, as director of the Royal Conservatory of Music.

=== Conductor ===
It was in 1881 that Martucci made his first conducting appearance. One of the earliest Italian musicians to admire Wagner, Martucci introduced some of Wagner's output to Italy. He led, for example, the first Italian performance of Tristan und Isolde in 1888 in Bologna. Nor did his enthusiasm for foreign composers end with Wagner's work. As well as performing Charles Villiers Stanford's 3rd ("Irish") Symphony in Bologna in 1898, he conducted one of the rare concerts of all-British orchestral music on the European continent in the later nineteenth century. What is more, he included music by Brahms, Lalo, Goldmark and others in his programmes.

=== Composer ===
Martucci began as a composer at the age of 16, with short piano works. He wrote no operas, which was unusual among Italian composers of his generation, but instead concentrated on instrumental music and songs, producing also an oratorio, Samuel.

== Legacy ==
Martucci was championed by Arturo Toscanini during much of the latter's career. The NBC Symphony Orchestra performed a number of Martucci's orchestral works in 1938, 1940, 1941, 1946, and 1953; although the performances were preserved on transcription discs, none was approved for commercial release by Toscanini. All of these performances have been given unofficial release in recent years, on LP as well as CD format. NBC musical director Samuel Chotzinoff, in his 1956 book "Toscanini—An Intimate Portrait", said that every time the Maestro proposed scheduling Martucci's works, certain orchestra members and NBC authorities objected, but the conductor was not to be deterred. Some Toscanini biographers (including Mortimer Frank and Harvey Sachs) have questioned the merit of the compositions, speculating that Toscanini may have performed them out of a sense of duty.

Gian Francesco Malipiero said of Martucci's second symphony (1904) that it was "the beginning of the renaissance of non-operatic Italian music." Martucci was an instrumentalist pur sang, taking absolute music as his highest goal.

In 1989 Francesco d'Avalos tried to start a revival of Martucci's music by recording four CDs with major works including the two piano concertos, two symphonies, and La canzone dei ricordi. These discs were distributed by ASV Records and later by Brilliant Classics.

In 2009, to mark the centenary of Martucci's death, Naxos Records released a series of CDs devoted to his orchestral music, featuring the Symphony Orchestra of Rome conducted by Francesco La Vecchia. In 2011 Riccardo Muti and the Chicago Symphony Orchestra featured Martucci's Nocturne, Op. 70, No. 1 during the orchestra's tour of Europe. Muti and the Chicago Symphony played the same piece as an encore, with prefatory remarks by Muti, at the conclusion of their Carnegie Hall concert on 21 January 2025.

== Works ==
=== Symphonic ===
- Polka (1871)
- Colore orientale, Op. 44, No. 3 (1880, 1908)
- Danza, Op. 44, No. 6 (1880, 1908)
- "Novelletta", for orchestra, Op. 6/1 (1907)
- Gavotta, Op. 55, No. 2 (1888, 1901)
- Gigue (Giga) in F major for orchestra, Op. 61, No. 3 (1883, 1892)
- Canzonetta, Op. 65, No. 2 (1884, 1889)
- Nocturne, Op. 70, No.1 (1891)
- Symphony No. 1 in D minor, Op. 75 (1888–95)
- Symphony No. 2 in F major, Op. 81 (1899–1904)
- Novelletta, Op. 82, No. 2 (1905, 1907)

=== Concertante ===
- Piano Concerto No. 1 in D minor, Op. 40 (1878)
- Tema con variazioni in E♭, Op. 58 (1882) (rev. 1900 & 1905) (orchestral arrangement by Martucci?)
- Piano Concerto No. 2 in B♭ minor, Op. 66 (1885)
- Andante for Cello and orchestra, Op. 69, No. 2 (1888) (rev. 1907)

=== Organ ===
- Sonata in D minor, Op. 36 (1879)

=== Chamber music ===
- Divertimento [after Verdi's La forza del destino] for Flute and Piano (1869)
- Piano Trio [after Offenbach's La belle Hélène] (1869)
- Violin Sonata in G minor, Op. 22 (1874)
- Piano Quintet in C major, Op. 45 (1878)
- Cello Sonata in F♯ minor, Op. 52 (1880)
- Minuetto for String Quartet, Op. 55, No. 1 (1880, 1893)
- Serenata for String Quartet, Op. 57, No. 2 (1886, 1893)
- Piano Trio No. 1 in C major, Op. 59 (1882)
- Piano Trio No. 2 in E♭ major, Op. 62 (1883)
- Momento musicale for String Quartet, Op. 64, No. 1 (1884, 1893)
- 3 Pieces for Violin and Piano, Op. 67 (1886)
- 3 Pieces for Cello and Piano, Op. 69 (1888)
- Melodia for Violin and Piano (1890)
- 2 Romances for Cello and Piano, Op. 72 (1890)

=== Piano ===
- 3 polkas and a mazurka (1867)
- Fantasia sull'opera La forza del destino, Op. 1 (1871)
- Polka improvvisata (1872)
- Capriccio No. 1, Op. 2 (1872)
- Capriccio No. 2, Op. 3 (1872)
- Mazurka di concerto, Op. 4 (1872)
- Andante e polka, Op. 5 (1873)
- Tarantella, Op. 6 (1873)
- Agitato, Op. 7 (1873)
- Pensieri sull'opera Un ballo in maschera for piano duet, Op. 8, (1873)
- Studio di concerto, Op. 9 (1873)
- Pensiero musicale, Op. 10 (1873)
- Tempo di mazurka in G♭ major, Op. 11 (1873)
- Capriccio No. 3, Op. 12 (1874)
- Allegro appassionato, Op. 13 (1874)
- Fugue in F minor, Op. 14 (1874)
- Capriccio No. 4, Op. 15 (1874)
- Melodia No. 1, Op. 16 (1874)
- Improvviso in F minor, Op. 17 (1874)
- Fuga a due parti, Op. 18 (1874)
- Polacca No. 1 in A major, Op. 19 (1874)
- Barcarola No. 1, Op. 20 (1874)
- Melodia No. 2, Op. 21 (1874)
- Scherzo in G major, Op. 23 (1875)
- Capriccio di concerto, Op. 24 (1875)
- Nocturne: Souvenir de Milan, Op. 25 (1875)
- Caprice en forme d'étude, Op. 26 (1875)
- 3 romances, Op. 27 (1875)
- Fughetta and Fugue, Op. 28 (1875)
- La caccia, Op. 29 (1876)
- Barcarola No. 2, Op. 30 (1876)
- 4 pieces, Op. 31 (1876)
- Fantasia in D minor, Op. 32 (1876)
- 3 pieces, Op. 33 (1876)
- Piano Sonata in E major, Op. 34 (1876)
- Mazurka in A♭ major, Op. 35 (1876)
- Racconto in memory of Bellini, Op. 37 (1877)
- 12 preludi facili (1877)
- 6 pieces, Op. 38 (1878)
- Souvenir de Paris, Op. 39 (1878)
- Sonata facile in B♭ major, Op. 41 (1878)
- 3 Notturninos, Op. 42 (1880)
- 7 pieces, Op. 43 (1878–82)
- 6 pieces, Op. 44 (1879–80)
- 3 Walzes, Op. 46( 1879)
- Studio, Op. 47 (1879)
- Polacca No. 2 in E♭ major, Op. 48 (1879)
- 3 romances, Op. 49 (1880–82)
- Novella, Op. 50 (1880)
- Fantasia in G minor, Op. 51 (1880)
- 3 Scherzi, Op. 53 (1881)
- Studio caratteristico, Op. 54 (1880)
- 2 pieces, Op. 55 (1880–8)
- Improvviso-fantasia, Op. 56 (1880)
- 2 pieces, Op. 57 (1886)
- Tema con variazioni, Op. 58 (1882), also for orchestra and 2 pianos (1900, 1905) (arrangement by Martucci?)
- Foglie sparse: album di 6 pezzi, Op. 60 (1883)
- 3 pieces, Op. 61 (1883)
- Moto perpetuo, Op. 63 (1884)
- 3 pieces, Op. 64 (1884)
- 3 pieces, Op. 65 (1884)
- Romanza in E-major (1889)
- 2 Nocturnes, Op. 70 (1891)
- Deux pièces, Op. 73 (1893)
- Trèfles à 4 feuilles, Op. 74 (1895)
- Trois morceaux, Op. 76 (1896)
- 2 pieces, Op. 77 (1896)
- 3 small pieces, Op. 78 (1900)
- 3 small pieces, Op. 79 (1901)
- 2 caprices, Op. 80 (1902)
- Melodia No. 3 (1902)
- 3 pieces, Op. 82 (1905)
- Novelletta, for piano, Op. 82/2 (1905)
- 3 pieces, Op. 83 (1905)

=== Vocal ===
- Messa a grande orchestra for solo voices, chorus and orchestra (1870–71)
- Alma gentil (S. Pellico) for Soprano or Tenor and Piano (1872)
- Samuel (F. Persico), oratorio for solo voices, chorus and orchestra (1881, 1906)
- La canzone dei ricordi (R. Pagliara), (Op. 68) song cycle, Mezzo Soprano or Baritone and piano (1887)
- La canzone dei ricordi (R. Pagliara), (Op. 68) song cycle, Mezzo Soprano or Baritone and orchestra (1898)
- Sogni (C. Ricci), (Op. 68) voice and piano (1888)
- Pagine sparse (Ricci), Op. 68 for voice and piano (1888)
- Ballando! (Ricci) for voice and piano (1889)
- Due canti (Pagliara), (Op. 68) for boys' voices and organ (1889)
- Tre pezzi (G. Carducci), Op. 84 for voice and piano (1906)
