= Rossiniana (Giuliani) =

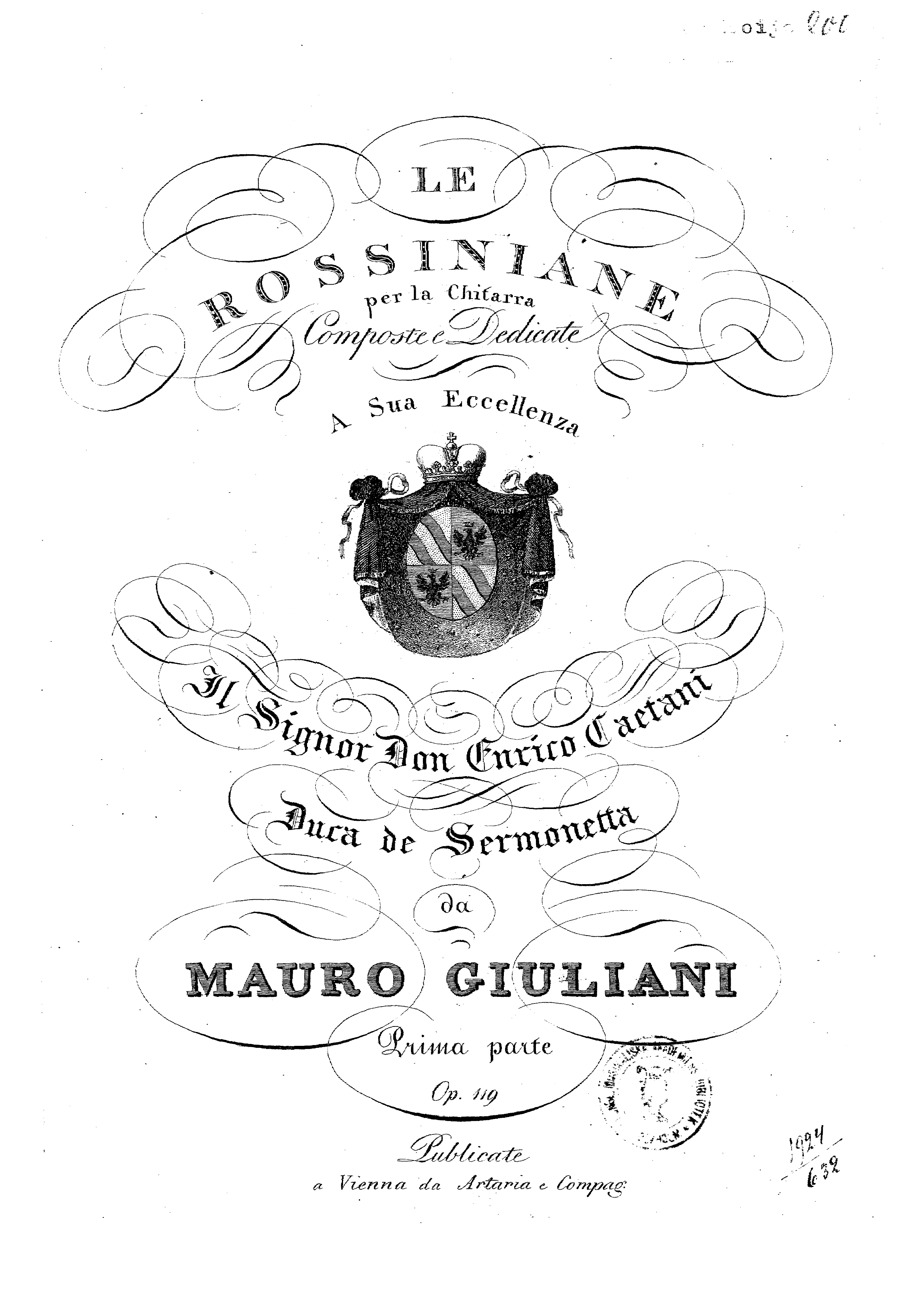
Giuliani Rossiniane

Mauro Giuliani’s Rossiniane are "operatic fantasies or potpourris" for the guitar based on themes by Rossini. Giuliani composed the six sets c. 1820–1828 (Opp. 119–124). Each set was called "Rossiniana", and collectively they are called "Rossiniane". This was the first known tribute by one composer to another using a title with the ending -ana.

There is no reference in the literature that they were jointly composed by Giuliani, Paganini (who also mastered the guitar), and Rossini himself. Giuliani alone is credited with composing the six sets.

Giuliani’s achievements as a composer were numerous. Giuliani’s 150 compositions for guitar with opus number constitute the nucleus of the nineteenth-century guitar repertory. He composed extremely challenging pieces for solo guitar as well as works for orchestra and guitar-violin and guitar-flute duos.

Thomas F. Heck attributes the rediscovery of the Rossiniane to the English guitarist Julian Bream, who publicly performed two of the pieces in the year 1973.

== Themes in Giuliani's Le Rossiniane ==
Rossiniana I, Op. 119

Introduction (Andantino)
“Assisa a piè d’un salice” (Otello)
“Languir per una bella” scene 3 atto 1, mndante grazioso (L’Italienne à Alger)
“Ai capricci della sorte” scene 5 atto 1, maestoso (L’Italienne à Alger)
“Caro, caro ti parlo in petto”, Moderato (L’Italienne à Alger)
“Cara, per te quest’anima”, Allegro vivace (Armida)

Rossiniana II, Op. 120

Introduction (Sostenuto)
“Deh ! Calma, o ciel”, Andantino sostenuto (Otello)
“Arditi all’ire”, Allegretto innocente (Armida)
“Non più mesta accanto al fuoco”, Maestoso (Cendrillon)
“Di piacer mi balza il cor” (La pie voleuse)
“Fertilissima Regina”, Allegretto (Cendrillon)

Rossiniana III, Op. 121

Introduction (Maestoso sostenuto)
“Un soave non so che” (Cendrillon)
“Oh mattutini albori!”, Andantino (La dame du lac)
“Questo vecchio maledetto” (Le Turc en Italie)
“Sorte! Secondami”, Allegro (Zelmira)
“Cinto di nuovi allori”, Maestoso (Ricciardo et Zoraïde)

Rossiniana IV, Op. 122

Introduction (Sostenuto-Allegro maestoso)
“Forse un dì conoscerete”, Andante (La pie voleuse)
“Mi cadono le lagrime” (La pie voleuse)
“Ah se puoi così lasciarmi”, Allegro maestoso (Moïse en Egypte)
“Piacer egual gli dei”, Maestoso (Mathilde de Shabran)
“Voglio ascoltar” (La pierre de touche)

Rossiniana V, Op. 123

Introduction (Allegro con brio)
“E tu quando tornerai”, Andantino mosso (Tancrède)
“Una voce poco fa” (Le Barbier de Séville)
“Questo è un nodo avviluppato”, Andante sostenuto (Cendrillon)
“Là seduto l’amato Giannetto”, Allegro (La pie voleuse)
“Zitti zitti, piano piano”, Allegro (Le Barbier de Séville)

Rossiniana VI, Op. 124

Introduction (Maestoso)
“Qual mesto gemito”, Larghetto (Sémiramis)
“Oh quante lagrime finor versai”, Maestoso (La dame du lac)
“Questo nome che suona vittoria”, Allegro brillante (Le siège de Corinthe)

The introduction from Rossiniana II has become well known in popular culture due to its inclusion in the cs_italy map from Counter-Strike.
