= Francesco La Vecchia =

Italian classical conductor

Francesco La Vecchia (born September 10, 1954) is an Italian classical conductor.

== Biography and career ==
La Vecchia was born in Rome, and began studying music with his grandfather, who taught him theory, harmony and composition. His first instrument was the classical guitar. He gave his first performance at age 9, and continued studying with Alirio Diaz. In 1972, he founded the Boccherini Quintet, and played hundreds of concerts with this ensemble in Europe, America and Asia.

In 1978, La Vecchia founded the Accademia Internazionale di Musica Arts Academy. In 1982 he began his career as conductor, and was named permanent conductor of the Symphonic Institution of Rome. Since then, La Vecchia has conducted more than one hundred orchestras around the world.

In 1993 La Vecchia founded the New World Young Orchestra in Latin America. In 2001 he was made director of the Professional Training Course for Orchestral Conductor Professors, and at this time launched the Ottorino Respighi Youth Orchestra. In 2002 he was named artistic and musical director of the Orchestra Sinfonica di Roma, and in 2009 he was named principal guest conductor of the Berliner Symphoniker Orchestra.

Specializing in Italian music, La Vecchia has made dozens of recordings, including the first complete orchestral works of Alfredo Casella and those of Giuseppe Martucci (that was previously recorded by M° Francesco d'Avalos with the Philarmonia Orchestra), the former for Naxos label the latter for ASV. He has also recorded the works of Franco Ferrara.
