= Beer engine =

Device for pumping beer from a cask

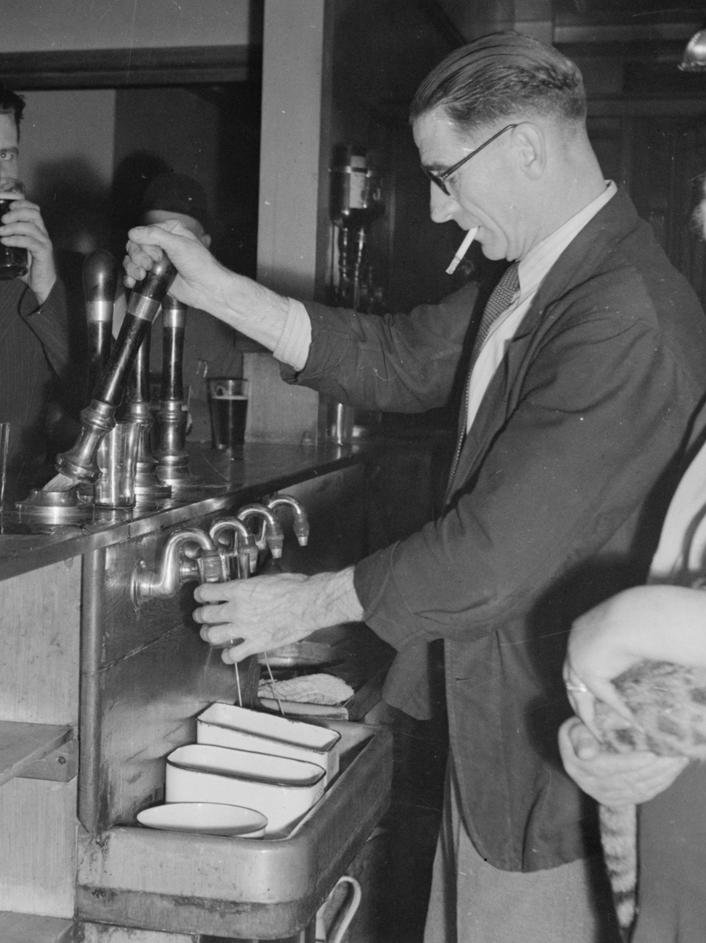
A barman pulling a pint with a beer engine in Reading, England, 1945

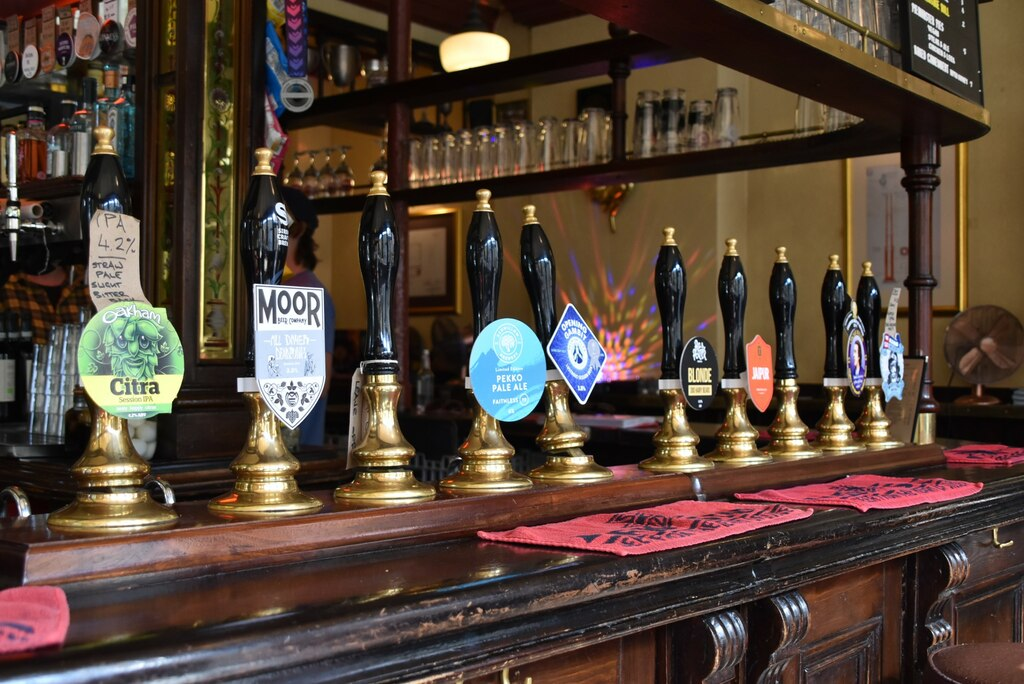
Beer engine handles on a bar

A beer engine is a device for pumping beer from a cask, usually located in a pub's cellar.

The beer engine is normally manually operated, although electrically powered and gas powered pumps are occasionally used; when manually powered, the term handpump is often used to refer to both the pump and the associated handle. A pump clip usually displays the name of the beer to the customer.

== History ==
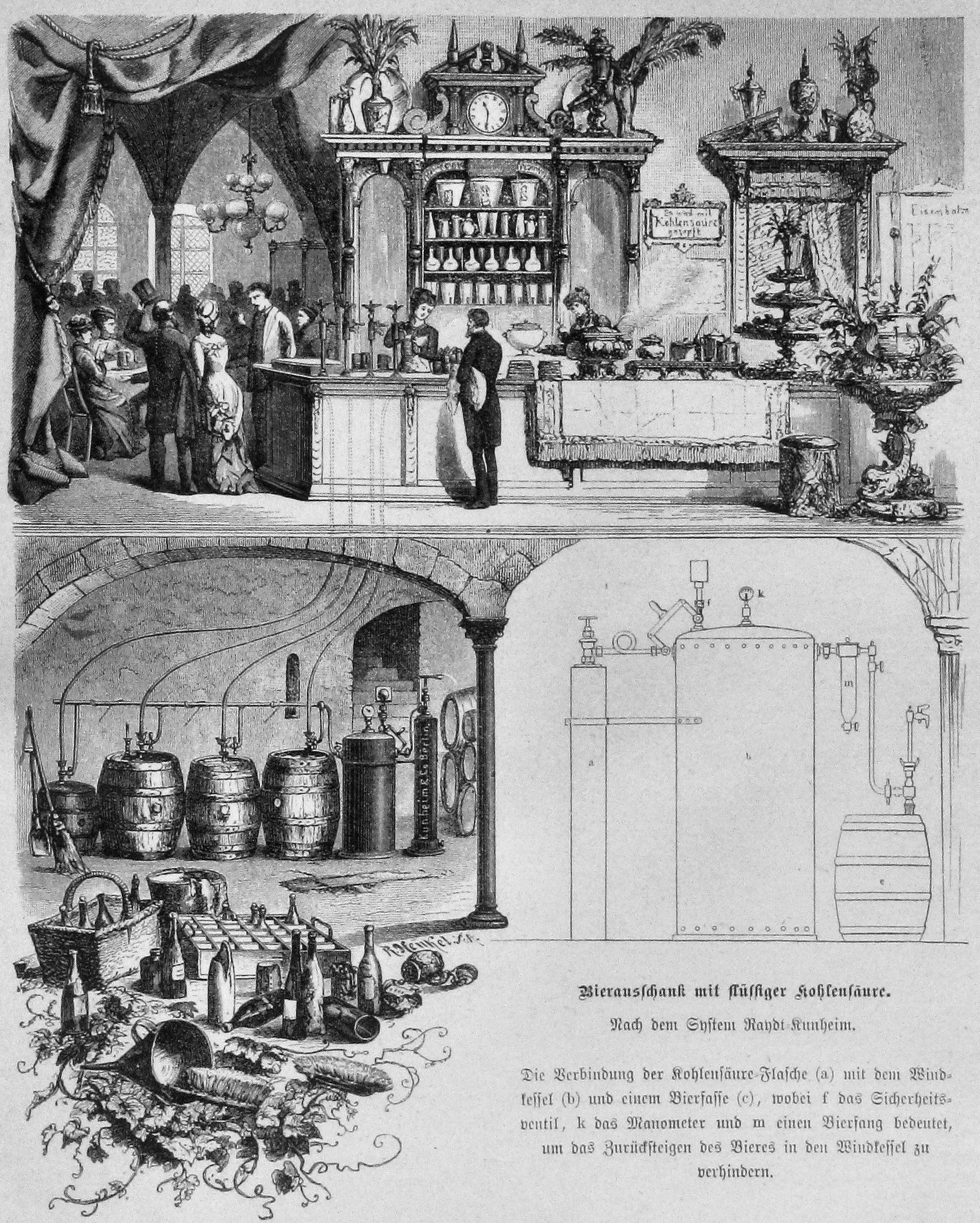
1883 illustration of a beer engine attached to casks in a cellar

The beer engine was invented by John Lofting, a Dutch inventor, merchant and manufacturer who moved from Amsterdam to London in about 1688 and patented a number of inventions including a fire hose and engine for extinguishing fires and a thimble knurling machine. The London Gazette of 17 March 1691 stated "the patentee hath also projected a very useful engine for starting of beers and other liquors which will deliver from 20 to 30 barrels an hour which are completely fixed with brass joints and screws at reasonable rates."

The locksmith and hydraulic engineer Joseph Bramah developed beer pumping further in 1797.

In the 1970s many breweries were keen to replace cask conditioned ale with keg versions for financial benefit, and started to disguise keg taps by adorning them with cosmetic hand pump handles. This practice was opposed as fraudulent by the Campaign for Real Ale and was discontinued.

== Components ==
The beer engine is normally located below the bar with the visible handle being used to draw the beer through a flexible tube to the spout, below which the glass is placed. Modern hand pumps may clamp onto the edge of the bar or be mounted on the top of the bar.

A pump clip is usually attached to the handle giving the name and sometimes the brewery, beer type and alcoholic strength of the beer being served through that handpump. Electrically powered and gas powered pumps are occasionally used.

The handle of a handpump is often used as a symbol of cask ale. This style of beer has continued fermentation and uses porous and non-porous pegs, called spiles, to respectively release and retain the gases generated by fermentation and thus achieve the optimum level of carbonation in the beer.

=== Swan neck ===
A swan neck is a curved spout. This is often used in conjunction with a sparkler - a nozzle containing small holes - fitted to the spout to aerate the beer as it enters the glass, giving a frothier head; this presentation style is more popular in the north of England than in the south.

=== Sparkler ===
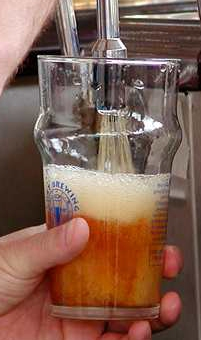
Beer dispensed through a sparkler

A sparkler is a device that can be attached to the nozzle of a beer engine. Designed rather like a shower-head, beer dispensed through a sparkler becomes aerated and frothy which results in a noticeable head.

The sparkler works via the venturi effect. As the beer flows through the nozzle, air is drawn into the beer. Consequently, the beer will have a head, whether or not the beer is alive (fresh).

Real ale only produces a head whilst the yeast is alive, when yeast produces carbon dioxide. Typically, after three days of opening a barrel of beer, the yeast will die, and the beer will be flat. A sparkler will disguise flat beer, replacing the missing carbon dioxide with nitrogen and oxygen.

Whether or not the beer is alive (fresh), whisking the beer changes the texture, and gaseous composition, which can change the taste.

There is an argument that the sparkler can reduce the flavour and aroma, especially of the hops, in some beers. The counter argument is that the sparkler takes away harshness and produces a smoother, creamier beer that is easier to quaff.

Breweries may state whether or not a sparkler is preferred when serving their beers. Generally, breweries in northern England serve their beers with a sparkler attached and breweries in the south without, but this is by no means definitive.

=== Pump clip ===
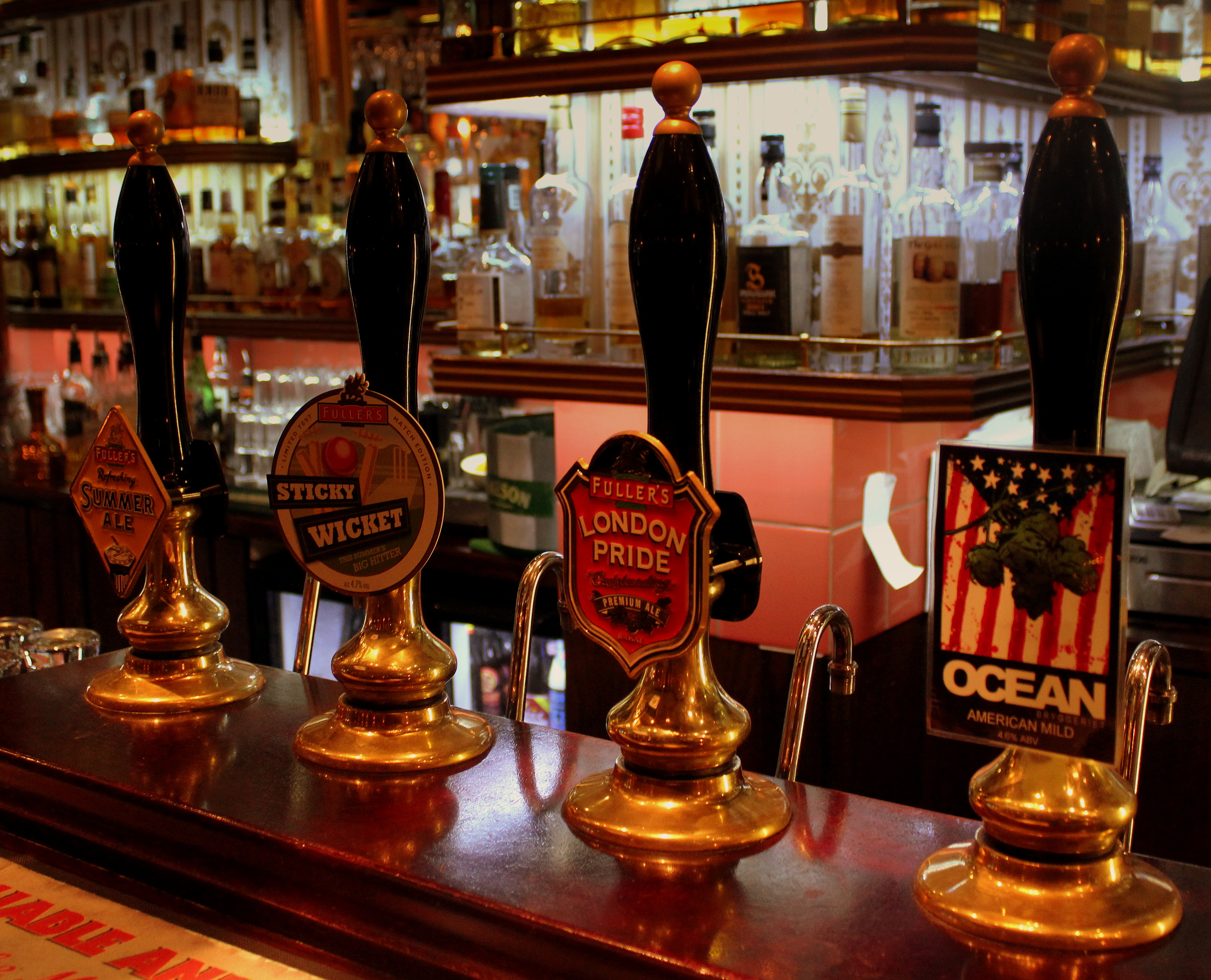
Pump clips on handpumps, with swan neck spouts visible behind

Pump clips are badges that are attached to handpumps in pubs to show which cask ales are available. In addition to the name of the beer served through the pump, they may give other details such as the brewer's name and alcoholic strength of the beer and serve as advertising.

Pump clips can be made of various materials. For beers that are brewed regularly by the big breweries, high quality plastic, metal or ceramic pump clips are used. Smaller breweries would use a printed plastic pump clip and for one-off beers laminated paper is used. There are variations on the material used, and the gaudiness or tastefulness of the decoration depending on how much the brewery wants to market their beers at the point of sale. Novelty pump clips have also been made of wood, slate and compact discs. Some even incorporate electronic flashing lights. Older pump clips were made of enamel.

The term pump clip originates from the clip that attaches it to the pump handle. These consist of a two-piece plastic ring which clamps to the handle with two screws. Plastic and laminated paper pump clips usually have a white plastic clip fixed with a sticky double-sided pad that pushes onto the handle.

== See also ==
- Beer tap
