= Paganiniana (Casella) =

Alfredo Casella

Paganiniana Op.65, is a Divertimento for orchestra composed in 1941/42 by Alfredo Casella and based on themes by Niccolò Paganini. The piece was commissioned in January 1941, to honor the centenary of the Vienna Philharmonic, which gave its premiere in Vienna, Großer Musikvereinsaal, 14 April 1942, under the direction of Karl Böhm. It is scored in four separate movements:

1. Allegro agitato
2. Polacchetta (Allegretto moderato)
3. Romanza (Larghetto cantabile, amoroso)
4. Tarantella (Presto molto)

The first movement is meant to portray the "satanic spirit of the great violinist", and uses four main themes, taken from Paganini's Caprices Nos.5, 12 and fragments from Nos.16, 19. The second, more melancholy, movement is derived from the final movement of Paganini's Guitar Quartet No.6 in D minor, Op.5/3, for violin, viola, cello, and guitar MS 33 (1815c). The third movement takes its subject from the section Larghetto cantabile amoroso of "La primavera" Sonata with Variations for violin and orchestra, MS 73 (1838c). The finale is taken from the "Tarantella in A minor", for violin and orchestra, MS 76 (1819-26c), borrowing also from the final movement of Paganini's Guitar Quartet No.4 in D minor, Op.5/1, MS 31 (1815c).

== See also ==
- List of variations on a theme by another composer
