= Alfredo Casella =

Italian composer, pianist, and conductor

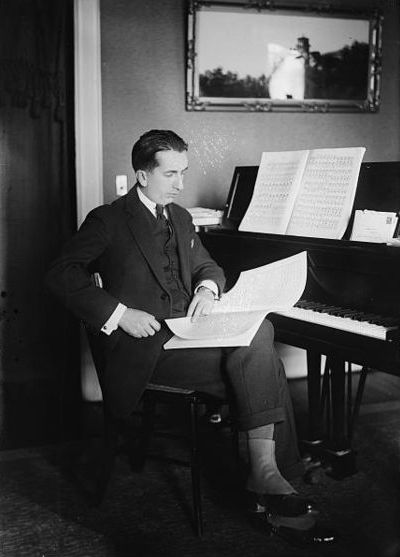
- Born: 25 July 1883; Turin, Kingdom of Italy
- Died: 5 March 1947 (aged 63); Rome, Italy
- Occupations: Composer; Classical pianist; Conductor

Alfredo Casella (25 July 1883 – 5 March 1947) was an Italian composer, pianist and conductor.

== Life and career ==
Alfredo Casella (photo with dedication from 1946)

Casella was born in Turin, the son of Maria (née Bordino) and Carlo Casella. His family included many musicians: his grandfather, a friend of Paganini, was first cello in the São Carlos Theatre in Lisbon and eventually became soloist in the Royal Chapel in Turin. Alfredo's father, Carlo, was also a professional cellist, as were Carlo's brothers Cesare and Gioacchino; his mother was a pianist, who gave the boy his first music lessons.

Alfredo entered the Conservatoire de Paris in 1896 to study piano under Louis Diémer and composition under Gabriel Fauré; in these classes, Lazare Lévy, George Enescu and Maurice Ravel were among his fellow students. During his Parisian period, Claude Debussy, Igor Stravinsky and Manuel de Falla were acquaintances, and he was also in contact with Ferruccio Busoni, Gustav Mahler and Richard Strauss.

Casella developed a deep admiration for Debussy's output after hearing Prélude à l'après-midi d'un faune in 1898, but pursued a more romantic vein (stemming from Strauss and Mahler) in his own writing of this period, rather than turning to impressionism. His first symphony of 1905 is from this time, and it is with this work that Casella made his debut as a conductor when he led the symphony's premiere in Monte Carlo in 1908.

Back in Italy during World War I, he began teaching piano at the Conservatorio Santa Cecilia in Rome. From 1927 to 1929 Casella was the principal conductor of the Boston Pops, where he was succeeded by Arthur Fiedler. He was one of the best-known Italian piano virtuosos of his generation and together with Arturo Bonucci (cello) and Alberto Poltronieri (violin) he formed the Trio Italiano in 1930. This group played to great acclaim in Europe and America. His stature as a pianist and his work with the trio gave rise to some of his best-known compositions, including A Notte Alta, the Sonatina, Nove Pezzi, and the Six Studies, Op. 70, for piano. For the trio to play on tour, he wrote the Sonata a Tre and the Triple Concerto.

Casella had his biggest success with the ballet La Giara, set to a scenario by Luigi Pirandello; other notable works include Italia, the Concerto Romano (commissioned by Rodman Wanamaker and premiered at the Wanamaker Auditorium in New York with the organ and Wanamaker collection of rare string instruments), Partita and Scarlattiana for piano and orchestra, the Violin and Cello Concerti, Paganiniana, and the Concerto for Piano, Strings, Timpani and Percussion. Amongst his chamber works, both Cello Sonatas are played with some frequency, as is the very beautiful late Harp Sonata, and the music for flute and piano. Casella also made live-recording player piano music rolls for the Aeolian Duo-Art system, all of which survive today and can be heard. In 1923, together with Gabriele D'Annunzio and Gian Francesco Malipiero from Venice, he founded an association to promote the spread of modern Italian music, the "Corporation of the New Music".

The resurrection of Antonio Vivaldi's works in the 20th century is mostly thanks to the efforts of Casella, who in 1939 organised the now historic Vivaldi Week, in which the poet Ezra Pound was also involved. Since then Vivaldi's compositions have enjoyed almost universal success and the advent of historically informed performance has only strengthened his position. In 1947 the Venetian businessman Antonio Fanna founded the Istituto Italiano Antonio Vivaldi, with the composer Malipiero as its artistic director, to promote Vivaldi's music and put out new editions of his works. Casella's work on behalf of his Italian Baroque musical ancestors put him at the centre of the early 20th-century Neoclassical revival in music and influenced his own compositions profoundly. His editions of Johann Sebastian Bach and Ludwig van Beethoven's piano works, along with many others, proved extremely influential on the musical taste and performance style of Italian players in the following generations.

The generazione dell'ottanta ("generation of the '80s"), including Casella himself, Malipiero, Respighi, Pizzetti, and Alfano—all composers born around 1880, the post-Puccini generation—concentrated on writing instrumental works, rather than operas, which Puccini and his musical forebears had specialised in. Members of this generation were the dominant figures in Italian music after Puccini's death in 1924; they had their counterparts in Italian literature and painting.

Casella, who was especially passionate about painting, accumulated an important collection of art and sculptures. He was perhaps the most "international" in outlook and stylistic influences of the generazione dell'ottanta, owing at least in part to his early musical training in Paris and the circle in which he lived and worked while there. He died in Rome.

Casella's students included Clotilde Coulombe, Stefan Bardas, Maria Curcio, Francesco Mander, Branka Musulin, Maurice Ohana, Robin Orr, Primož Ramovš, Nino Rota, Maria Tipo, Gaetano Giuffrè, Camillo Togni, and Bruna Monestiroli.

=== Marriage ===
He was married in Paris in 1921 to Yvonne Müller (Paris 1892 – Rome 1977). Their granddaughter is actress Daria Nicolodi and their great-granddaughter is actress Asia Argento.

Casella, who identified for many years with the Fascist regime in Italy, found himself in conflict with it after the legislation of the Italian racial laws of 1938, his wife being Jewish of French origin. From 1943 he lived in constant fear of being torn from his wife and their daughter, who were subject to arrest and deportation. One evening, having been tipped off about a raid on their flat, the family split up and hid in the homes of friends, not to reassemble until the 'Jew hunt' had ended.

== Works ==
=== Orchestral ===
- Symphony No. 1 in B minor, Op. 5 (1905–6)
- Italia, Rapsodia per Orchestra, Op. 11 (1909)
- Symphony No. 2 in C minor, Op. 12 (1908–9)
- Suite in C major, Op. 13 (1909–10)
- Suite from the Ballet Le Couvent sur l'Eau (Il Convento Veneziano), Op. 19 (1912–3)
- Pagine di Guerra, Op. 25bis (1918)
- Pupazzetti, Op. 27bis (1920)
- Elegia Eroica, Op. 29 (1916)
- Concerto per Archi, Op. 40bis (1923–4)
- La Giara, Suite Sinfonica, Op. 41bis (1924)
- Serenata per piccola orchestra, Op. 46bis (1930)
- Marcia Rustica, Op. 49 (1929)
- La Donna Serpente, Frammenti Sinfonici Seria I, Op. 50bis (1928–31)
- La Donna Serpente, Frammenti Sinfonici Seria II, Op. 50ter (1928–31)
- Introduzione, Aria e Toccata per Orchestra, Op. 55 (1933)
- Introduzione, Corale e Marcia, Op. 57 (1931–5) for Band, Piano, Double Basses and Percussion
- Concerto per Orchestra, Op. 61 (1937)
- Symphony No. 3, Op. 63 (1939–40)
- Divertimento per Fulvia, Op. 64 (1940)
- Paganiniana: Divertimento per Orchestra, Op. 65 (1942)
- Concerto for Strings, Piano, Timpani, and Percussion, Op. 69 (1943)

=== Concertante ===
- A notte alta, for Piano and Orchestra, Op. 30bis (1921)
- Partita for Piano and Orchestra, Op. 42 (1924–5)
- Concerto Romano for Organ, Brass, Timpani, and Strings, Op. 43 (1926) commissioned for the Wanamaker Organ in New York
- Scarlattiana, for Piano and Small Orchestra, Op. 44 (1926)
- Violin Concerto in A minor, Op. 48 (1928)
- Notturno e Tarantella for Cello and Orchestra, Op. 54 (1934)
- Triple Concerto, Op. 56 (1933)
- Cello Concerto, Op. 58 (1934–5)

=== Chamber and instrumental ===
- Barcarola e Scherzo for Flute and Piano, Op. 4 (1903)
- Cello Sonata No. 1, Op. 8 (1906)
- Sicilienne et Burlesque for Flute and Piano, Op. 23 (1914)
- Pagine di Guerra, Op. 25 (1915) Quattro 'films' musicali per pianoforte a quattro mani
- Pupazzetti, Op. 27 Cinque Pezzi Facili per Pianoforte a Quattro Mani (1915)
- Cinque Pezzi per Quartetto d'Archi, Op. 34 (1920)
- Concerto per Quartetto d'Archi, Op. 40 (1923–4)
- Cello Sonata No. 2 in C major, Op. 45 (1926)
- Minuet from 'Scarlattiana' (1926) for Violin and Piano
- Serenata per Cinque Instrumenti, Op. 46 (1927)
- Cavatina and Gavotte from the `Serenata Italiana' (1927) for Violin and Piano
- Prelude and Danza Siciliana from `La Giara' (1928), for Violin and Piano
- Sinfonia for Piano, Violoncello, Clarinet, and Trumpet, Op. 53 (1932)
- Notturno for Cello and Piano (1934)
- Tarantella for Cello and Piano (1934)
- Sonata a Tre (Piano Trio), Op. 62 (1938)
- Harp Sonata, Op. 68 (1943)

=== Piano ===
- Pavane, Op. 1 (1902)
- Variations sur une Chaconne, Op. 3 (1903)
- Toccata, Op. 6 (1904)
- Sarabande, Op. 10 (1908)
- Notturnino (1909)
- Berceuse triste, Op. 14 (1909)
- Barcarola, Op. 15 (1910)
- À la Manière de..., Prima Serie, Op. 17 (1911)
- À la Manière de..., Seconda Serie, Op. 17bis (1914)
- Nove Pezzi, Op. 24 (1914)
- Sonatina, Op. 28 (1916)
- A Notte Alta, Poema Musicale, Op. 30 (1917)
- Deux Contrastes, Op. 31 (1916–8)
- Inezie, Op. 32 (1918)
- Cocktail Dance (1918)
- Foxtrot per pianoforte a quattro mani (1920)
- Undici Pezzi Infantili, Op. 35 (1920)
- Due Canzoni Popolari Italiane, Op. 47 (1928)
- Due Ricercari sul nome B-A-C-H, Op. 52 (1932)
- Sinfonia, Arioso e Toccata, Op. 59 (1936)
- Ricercare sul Nome Guido M. Gatti (1942)
- Studio Sulle Terze Maggiori (1942)
- Sei Studi, Op. 70 (1942–44)
- Trois Pieces pour pianola, before 1921

=== Vocal ===
- Nuageries (1903) [Jean Richepin]
- Five Songs, Op. 2 (1902)
- La Cloche Felee, Op. 7 (1904) [Baudelaire]
- Trois Lyriques, Op. 9 (1905) [Albert Samain, Baudelaire, Verlaine]
- Sonnet, Op. 16 (1910) [Ronsard]
- Cinque Frammenti Sinfonici per Soprano ed Orchestra da Le Convent sur l'Eau (Il Convento Veneziano), Op. 19 (1912–4)
- Notte di Maggio, for Voice and Orchestra, Op. 20 (1913)
- Due Canti, Op. 21 (1913)
- Deux Chansons Anciennes, Op. 22 (1912)
- L'Adieu à la Vie, Op. 26 (1915) for Voice and Piano
- L'Adieu à la Vie, Op. 26bis (1915/26) Quattro Liriche Funebri per Soprano ed Orchestra da Camera dal 'Gitanjali' di R. Tagore [Trans. A. Gide]
- Tre Canzoni Trecentesche, Op. 36 (1923) [Cino da Pistoia]
- La Sera Fiesolana, Op. 37 (1923) for Voice and Piano [D'Annunzio]
- Quattro Favole Romanesche, Op. 38 (1923) [Trilusso]
- Due Liriche, Op. 39 (1923) for Voice and Piano
- Tre Vocalizzi for Voice and Piano (1929)
- Tre Canti Sacri for Baritone and Organ, Op. 66 (1943)
- Tre Canti Sacri for Baritone and Small Orchestra, Op. 66bis (1943)
- Missa Solemnis Pro Pace, Op. 71 (1944) per Soli, Coro e Orchestra

=== Stage ===
- Le Couvent sur l'Eau (Il Convento Veneziano), Op. 18 (1912–3) Ballet [J.-L. Vaudoyer]
- La Giara, Op. 41 (1924) Ballet [Pirandello]
- La donna serpente, Op. 50 (1928–31) Opera, Libretto by C.V. Ludovici after C. Gozzi
- La Favola d'Orfeo, Op. 51 (1932) Chamber Opera, Libretto by C. Pavolini after A. Poliziano
- Il Deserto Tentato, Op. 60 (1937) Mistero in Un Atto, Libretto by Pavolini
- La Camera dei Disegni (Balletto per Fulvia), Op. 64 (1940) Ballet
- La Rosa del Sogno, Op. 67 (1943) Ballet, partly after Paganiniana, Op. 65

=== Writings ===
- The Evolution of Music Throughout the History of the Perfect Cadence (London, 1924)
- Igor Strawinsky (Rome, 1926; Alfredo Casella, Strawinski, new edition ed. by Benedetta Saglietti e Giangiorgio Satragni, preface Quirino Principe, Roma, Castelvecchi, 2016)
- ...21 + 26, an Autobiography (Rome, 1931)
- Il Pianoforte (Rome–Milan, 1937)
- La Tecnica dell'Orchestra Contemporanea (Rome and New York, 1950)
- I Segreti della Giara, Original Italian Edition of Casella's Autobiography (Florence, 1941)
- Music in My Time, Autobiography, English Edition by Spencer Norton (Norman, Oklahoma, 1955)
- Plus numerous articles in musical journals

== Recordings ==
- Piano rolls listed at The Reproducing Piano Roll Foundation
