= Drink coaster =

Item to stand beverage container on

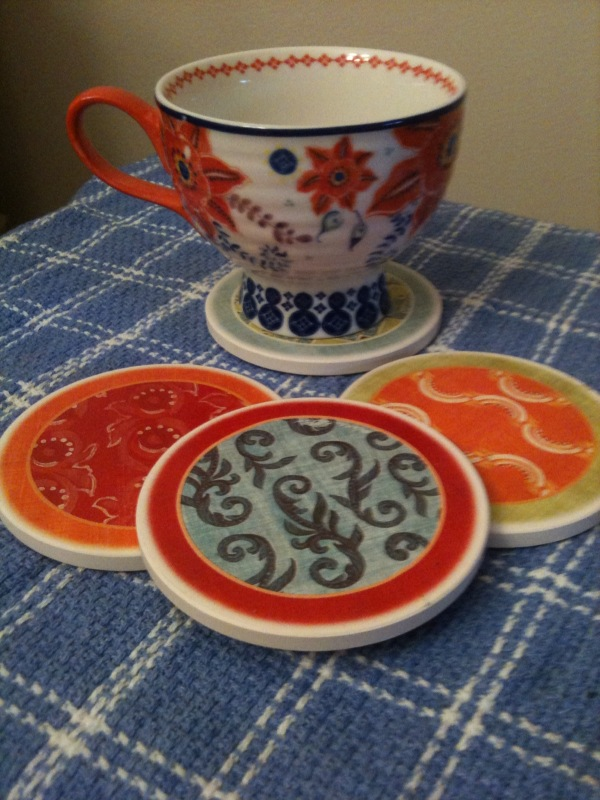
Drink coasters made of sandstone

A coaster, drink coaster, beverage coaster, or beermat is an object used to rest drinks upon. Coasters protect the surface of a table, or any other surface where a user might place a cup, from condensation created by cold drinks. A coaster on top of a beverage can also be used to show that a drink is not finished or to prevent contamination (usually from insects). Coasters can also stop hot drinks from burning the table surface.

In a pub or bar, coasters are used to protect tables and bar surfaces. Coasters are often branded with trademarks or alcohol advertising. Coasters are not to be confused with bar mats, which are larger pieces of rubber or absorbent material that are used to protect countertops or floors and to limit the spread of spilled drinks.

== History ==
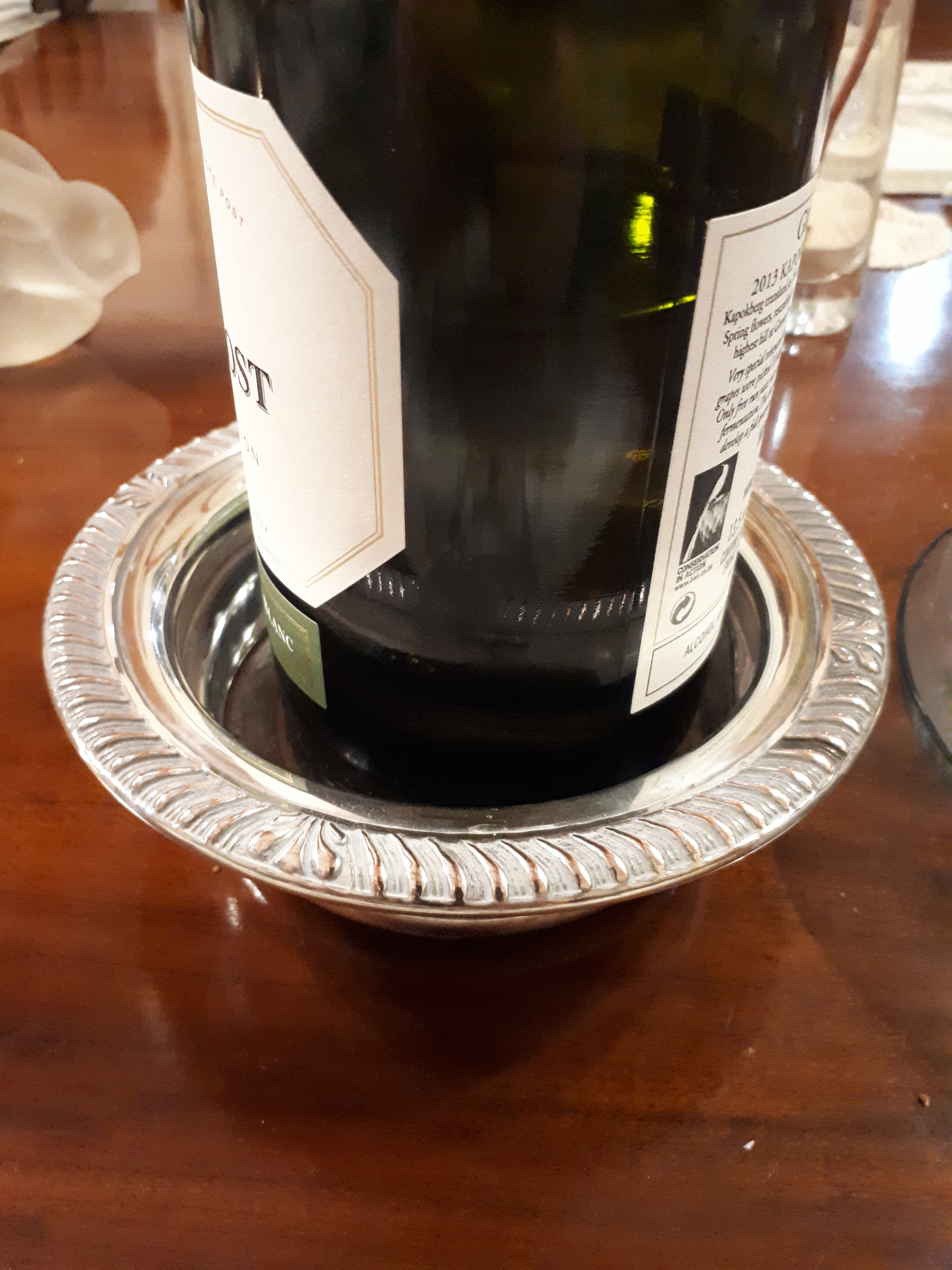
A silver wine bottle coaster

The first coasters were designed for decanters or wine bottles so that they could be slid (or "coasted") around the dinner table after the servants had retired. They were in common use after about 1760. Early coasters took the form of a shallow tray or dish made of wood, papier-mâché, silver, or silver plate.

In 1880, a German printing company, Friedrich Horn, introduced the first coaster made of cardboard. In 1892, Robert Sputh of Dresden manufactured the first coaster made of wood pulp. Watney's brewery introduced them to the United Kingdom in 1920 to advertise their pale ale. The packaging company Quarmby Promotions, established in 1872, began manufacturing coasters in Milnsbridge in 1931. After Quarmby Promotions was taken over by the Katz Group, it moved production to Brighouse and in 2006 to Morley, West Yorkshire, before closing its production in 2009.

Saucers are also long used in western culture for much the same purpose. When drinking tea, it is customary to use a cup and saucer set. By the mid-twentieth century, drink coasters made in many materials and styles were manufactured for domestic use. Today, they are common as everyday houseware pieces and are also used in restaurants.

== Manufacturing ==
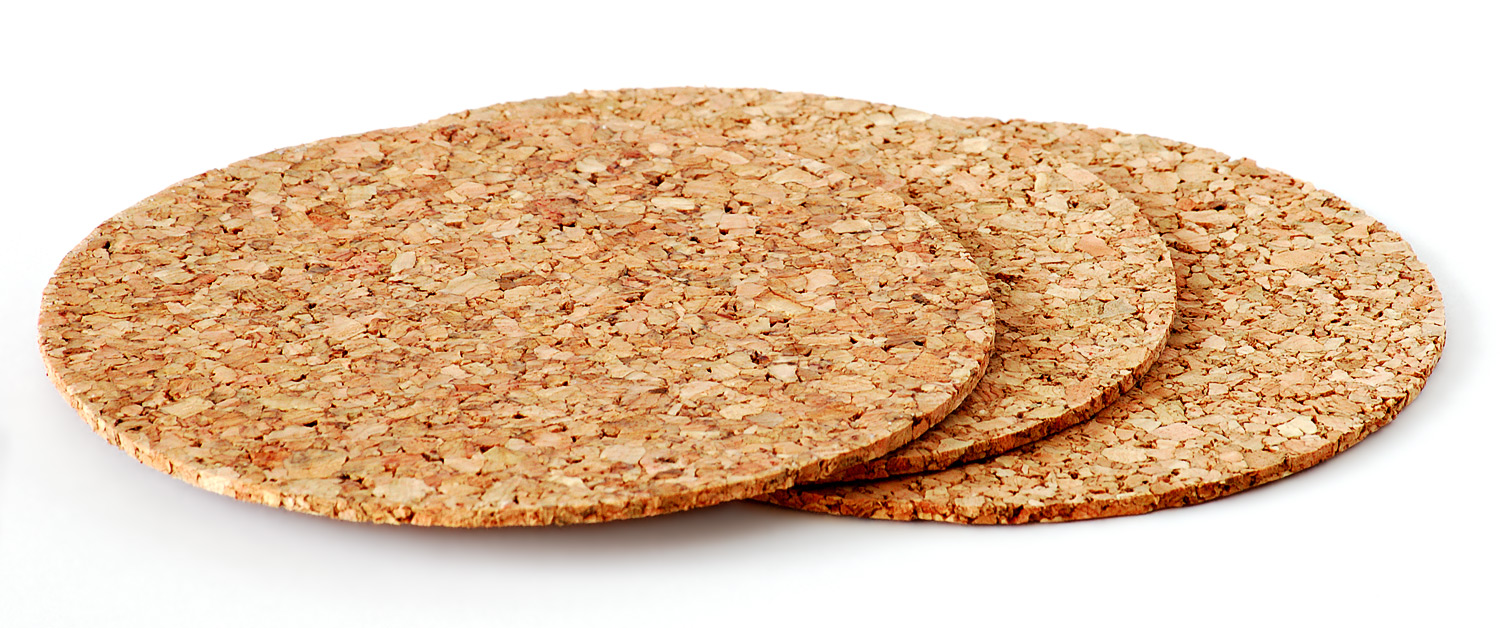
Drink coasters made from cork

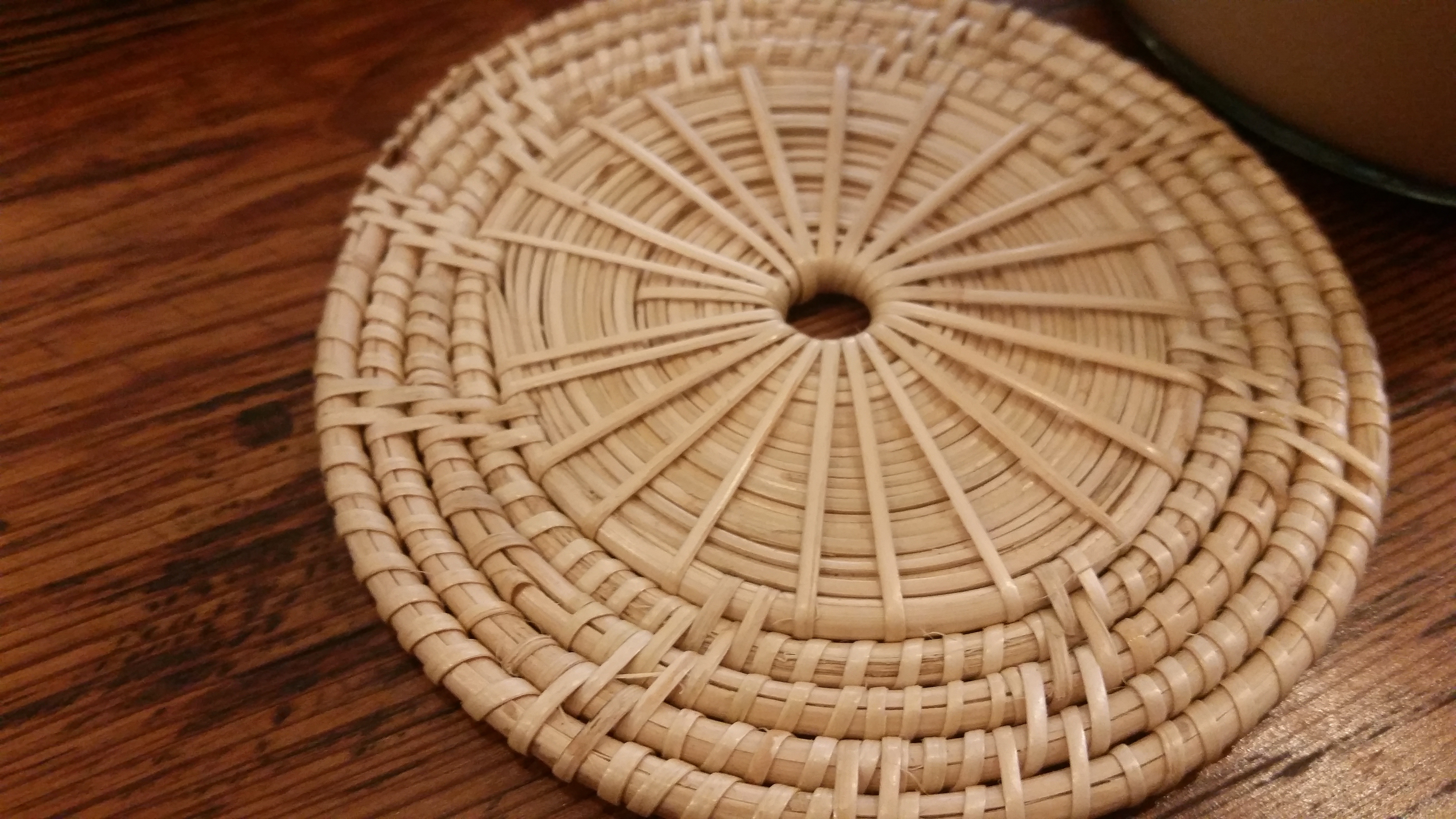
A drink coaster made from bamboo strips

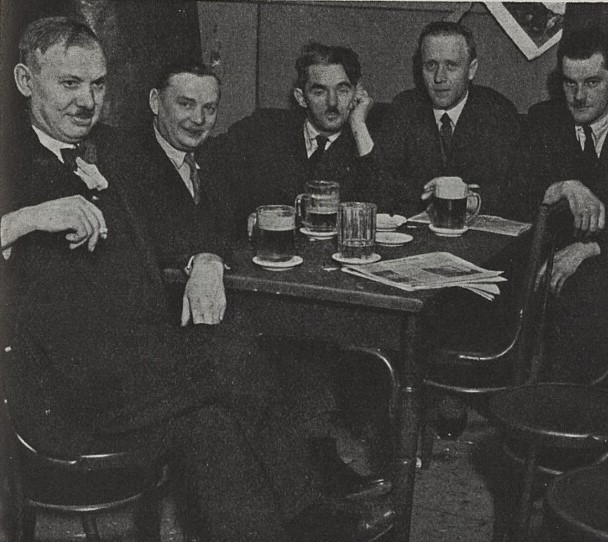
Czech men drinking beer with ceramic coasters (1936)

Coasters are often made from high grammage paperboard but may also be constructed from multiple layers of tissue paper. Drink coasters are also sometimes made from materials such as soapstone, metal, wood, and silicone. Important parameters for coasters include water absorbency, wet rub resistance, and printability.

Some drink coasters are made to be recyclable or biodegradable. Pulpboard coasters, commonly used in bars and restaurants, are designed to absorb condensation and protect surfaces from moisture. Several manufacturers produce custom-printed pulpboard coasters at varying scales.

== Coaster imprints ==
Coasters are often adorned with a customized image, usually mentioning or advertising a brand of beer. However, they can also promote a drinking establishment, sports franchise, businesses, or special events.

== Tegestology ==
Some coasters are collectible items. Tegestology is a term coined from Latin (teges "covering" or "mat", and etis) defined as the practice of collecting coasters, with practitioners known as tegestologists. A 1960 British Pathé News short shows comedy duo Morecambe and Wise as tegestologists.
