= Medieval lituus =

The medieval lituus was a musical instrument of an indeterminate nature, known only from records which ascribe it various properties. Johann Sebastian Bach's O Jesu Christ, Meins Lebens Licht contains the only known piece of music written for an instrument under this name.

== Medieval use ==
Chroniclers of the Crusades from the 11th through the 13th centuries often used the various Classical Latin terms for trumpets and horns—including tuba, cornu, buccina, and lituus—alongside the more up-to-date French term trompe with reference to instruments employed in the Christian armies. However, it is difficult or impossible to determine just what instruments were meant, and it is not likely they were the same as the Roman instruments called by these names.

In the early 15th century, Jean de Gerson listed the lituus among those string instruments that were sounded by beating or striking, either with the fingernails, a plectrum, or a stick. Other instruments Gerson names in this category are the cythara, guiterna, psalterium, timpanum, and campanula.

== Later use ==
By the late 16th century the word was being applied to a variety of different instruments. A 1585 English translation of Hadrianus Junius's Nomenclator defines lituus as "a writhen or crooked trumpet winding in and out; a shaulme" (i.e., shawm). The early Baroque composer and author Michael Praetorius used the word as a Latin equivalent of the German "Schallmeye" (shawm) or for the "Krumbhoerner" (crumhorns)—in the latter case also offering the Italian translations storti, and cornamuti torti.

With an added adjective, the term lituus alpinus, was used in 1555 by the Swiss naturalist Conrad Gessner in the earliest published description of the Alphorn: "nearly eleven feet long, made from two pieces of wood slightly curved and hollowed out, fitted together and skillfully bound with osiers".

In the eighteenth century the word once again came to describe contemporary brass instruments, such as in a 1706 inventory from the Ossegg monastery in Bohemia, which equates it with the hunting horn: "litui vulgo Waldhörner duo ex tono G". Nevertheless, in 1732 Johann Gottfried Walther referred back to Renaissance and Medieval definitions, defining lituus as "a cornett, formerly it also signified a shawm or, in Italian tubam curvam, a HeerHorn". (Heerhorn or Herhorn was a Middle High German name for a metal, slightly curved military signal horn, approximately five feet long, played with the bell turned upward.) In 1738, the well-known horn player Anton Joseph Hampel served as a godfather at the baptism of a daughter of the renowned Dresden lutenist Silvius Leopold Weiss. In the baptismal register he was described as "Lituista Regius"—"royal lituus player". In the second half of the 18th century "lituus" was described in one source as a Latin name for the trumpet or horn.

Johann Sebastian Bach specified the use of two litui for his composition O Jesu Christ, Meins Lebens Licht (BWV 118). This motet or cantata, written in the 1730s, is believed to be the only surviving score that specifies the use of the lituus, and the only known piece ever written for the instrument. Since there are no known surviving examples of a Baroque lituus, the exact appearance and sound is unknown. However, researchers have relied on depictions of instruments they believed to be similar to the lituus in order to approximate its characteristics.

== Reconstruction ==
The modern design and construction of Bach's lituus was initiated when the Schola Cantorum Basiliensis (SCB) in Switzerland approached a PhD student at the University of Edinburgh to assist with the recreation. The student and his research team had developed a software application for working with brass instrument design. The SCB provided the Edinburgh team with details and assumptions about the correct design of the lituus. The software application was then to convert those designs into an accurate representation of the shape, pitch, and tone of the medieval instrument. The Edinburgh team produced two identical prototypes, approximately 2.5 meters long. The lituuses are straight and thin, with a flared bell at the end. The horns are made of pine and feature cow horn mouthpieces. The Edinburgh team noted that the reconstructed instrument could easily have been made in Bach's time using then-current technology.

The tone of the finished instruments is described as "piercing" and they have a limited range. One member of the development team referred to the tone as being "broadly like a trumpet" but more "haunting". The reconstructed lituus has also been described as difficult to play.

SCB musicians used the reconstructed lituus in a performance of O Jesu Christ, Meins Lebens Licht, believing they are the first to do so since Bach's time.
