= Aeneator =

Ancient Roman military horn player

An aeneator (Latin: aēneātor or ahēneātor) was a specialized player of wind instruments who was attached to a Roman military unit. The word comes from Latin aēneus or ahēneus, "brazen", from aes, "copper alloy". While the size of individual Roman military units may have varied, they made extensive use of both acoustical and visual signaling in communications and each had an assigned banner bearer (vexillarius) and at least one aeneator. A variety of instruments were used by aeneatores, including the buccina, cornu, tuba, and lituus. In addition to their roles in the Roman army, aeneatores were also used for processionals and games, particularly in marching home from war.

== Categories of aeneatores ==
Aeneatores who blew a buccina (a C-shaped horn made of bronze or silver or animal horn) were known as buccinators; those who blew a cornu (a G-shaped horn made of brass) were known as cornicines; those who blew a tuba (a straight bronze horn with a slight flare at the end) were known as tubicines or tubatores; players of the lituus were called liticines. Cornicines and tubicines mostly performed uncomplicated tactical signaling on the battlefield, and therefore were not accorded special status in the military unit. They had call duties in the barracks, just as other commonly conscripted soldiers had. By contrast, the bucinator was seen as a specially-skilled member of the unit who was capable of performing a wider repertoire and was used to perform a variety of ceremonial duties. Many units accorded bucinators immunes status, and there were equestrian bucinatores that served as cavalry buglers.

== See also ==
- List of Roman army unit types
