= Offstage instrument or choir part in classical music =

Sound effect

An offstage instrument or choir part in classical music is a sound effect used in orchestral and opera which is created by having one or more instrumentalists (trumpet players, also called an "offstage trumpet call", horn players, woodwind players, percussionists, other instrumentalists) from a symphony orchestra or opera orchestra play a note, melody, or rhythm from behind the stage, or having a choir of singers sing a melody from behind the stage.

This creates a distant, muted effect which composers use to suggest "celestial voices", melancholy, or nostalgia, or to create a haunting or mysterious effect. Some composers use larger offstage groups, (such as the 16 offstage brass instruments in Richard Strauss' Alpine Symphony) that they can create antiphonal effects, in which the main orchestra and the offstage instruments alternate their parts. In some works, the offstage instruments are arrayed in the balconies or amidst the audience, which is a more forceful sound, since the volume is not muted by walls or doors. In some pieces, the offstage performers change how far they are away from the main orchestra in their first and second performance in a piece; if a performer moves from far backstage to close to the wings, it will give the audience the impression that the band is moving closer.

The conductor decides where to position the offstage instruments or singers, whether this is backstage, in the wings, balcony, or elsewhere. When there are large offstage ensembles, they may be conducted by a second assistant conductor. In the 19th century and the early 20th century, prior to the invention of closed-circuit television, offstage music was challenging to coordinate with the onstage ensemble, because to achieve the muted, distant effect that is often sought out, the players or singers would have to move fairly far backstage; however, getting far away from the main orchestra made it hard to stay in time and in tune with the main orchestra. Since the 1970s and 1980s, the widespread availability of technologies such as affordable closed circuit TV cameras and TV monitors, monitor speakers, and in the 1980s, inexpensive electronic tuners made it easier to coordinate offstage and onstage musicians and/or singers with the onstage ones.

An offstage part may be requested by the use of the German instruction "auf dem Theater" or the Italian instructions "tromba interna" or "banda". While offstage instrumental parts are usually for brass or percussion instruments, in Berlioz' Symphonie Fantastique, an offstage oboe is used in the third movement and in Krzysztof Penderecki's Symphony No. 7 "Seven Gates of Jerusalem", the brass and percussion are joined by clarinets, bassoons, and a contrabassoon.

== History ==
In the third movement of Berlioz's Symphonie fantastique, the oboe plays offstage as the echo of the cor anglais. In Act III of his opera Les Troyens, a group of offstage trumpets plays a distorted-sounding fanfare along with cornets to create an unusual dramatic effect. In Beethoven's Leonore Overture and in the ouverture to Fidelio he used an offstage trumpet call. In Respighi's The Pines of Rome, he uses an offstage trumpet for "Pines Near a Catacomb"; after the low strings play solemn chords, and the trombones play a simple, ancient-sounding Gregorian chant-style melody, an offstage trumpet introduces the piece's second theme. Richard Strauss used offstage trumpets during a battle scene in Ein Heldenleben ("A Hero's Life"). Aaron Copland's Quiet City uses an offstage trumpet. Gustav Mahler's Symphony No. 2 uses an offstage brass ensemble of trumpets, French horns, and percussion. While the offstage trumpet's distant sound can create an emotional effect, critic Maurice Brown warned in 1971 that it can become an overused cliché.

Offstage town bands which play fanfares and other music in Verdi and Donizetti operas are often not scored. The conductor has to acquire or arrange music for the offstage band to play. These offstage bands are called "banda" in Italian.

== Performance challenges ==
Offstage music performed in the theater as an effect in a play is often less problematic than performing offstage music with an orchestra. In a theater context, the offstage sound effects are less likely to have to be synchronized exactly with other rhythms or pitches. For example, in some Shakespeare plays, the script calls for an offstage bugle call to indicate that enemy soldiers are in the distance. This cue does not have to be aligned with any other pitches or rhythms; it only needs to occur within the correct part of a scene, so a leeway of several seconds is acceptable.

Performing offstage music that has to be in synchronization with a larger ensemble on the stage involves potential problems with rhythm and pitch, because a difference of even a part of a second or a fraction of a semitone of pitch will be noticeable to the audience. If the conductor wants a truly muted and distant sound, the offstage players need to be behind the stage or in an adjoining hall, not merely standing in the wings of the stage. If the offstage players are in an adjoining hallway or room behind the stage area, they may not be able to see the conductor or hear the orchestra. Even if they can hear the orchestra, their perception of the pitch and timing may be affected by the distance and refraction of the sound. If trumpet or French horn players attempt to tune their notes by ear to the orchestra pitch that they hear, their pitch may sound flat to the audience and conductor even if it is "correct" to the trumpeter or French hornists' ear, because a brass instrument's pitch varies over a long distance, and thus may sound flat in comparison to the orchestra. One trumpet book suggests that offstage trumpeters play sharper than true pitch, to compensate for these effects.

To overcome these problems, conductors sometimes have an assistant conductor who cues the offstage player, but this can result in miscues or time lags. These problems have led to humorous anecdotes in the 19th and early 20th century, such as the case cited by Sir Malcolm Arnold, in which he jokes about a performance of Beethoven's Leonore Overture in which the offstage trumpet part was "conspicuous by its absence", because the backstage performer misunderstood the cue, and failed to play. Since the 1980s, both of these challenges have been surmounted with technology. To ensure that the offstage performer is in rhythm with the orchestra, a closed-circuit TV can be set up backstage to transmit video feed of the conductor's moving baton and hands. To ensure that the offstage performer is in pitch with the rest of the orchestra, the offstage performer can play while watching an electronic tuner which indicates whether he or she is sharp or flat.

== Instruments ==
- Ludwig van Beethoven
  - Leonore Overture No. 2 and 3 – 1 trumpet
- Hector Berlioz
  - Symphonie Fantastique – 1 oboe in the third movement.
  - Requiem – 4 brass bands, placed north, south, east and west of the audience
- Havergal Brian
  - Symphony No. 1 (The Gothic) – Four groups, each containing 2 horns, 2 trumpets, 2 trombones, 2 tubas and 1 set of timpani
- Benjamin Britten
  - Serenade for Tenor, Horn and Strings – the solo horn in the Epilogue
- Paul Hindemith
  - Mathis der Maler - 3 trumpets during scene 4
- Charles Ives
  - Symphony No. 4 – violins, viola, and harp
- Gustav Mahler
  - Das klagende Lied – Piccolo, 2 flutes in D♭, 2 oboes, 2 clarinets in E♭, 2 clarinets in B♭, 4 horns in Fm, 2 trumpets in B♭, timpani, triangle, cymbal
  - Symphony No. 1 – 3 trumpets
  - Symphony No. 2 – 4 trumpets, 4–6 horns, bass drum with cymbals attached, triangle and timpani
  - Symphony No. 3 – Snare drums and posthorn
  - Symphony No. 6 – Cowbells and deep tubular bells
  - Symphony No. 7 – Cowbells
  - Symphony No. 8 – 4 trumpets and 3 trombones
- Krzysztof Penderecki
  - Symphony No. 7 "Seven Gates of Jerusalem" – 3 clarinets, 3 bassoons, contrabassoon, 4 horns, 3 trumpets, 4 trombones, 1 tuba
- Sergei Prokofiev
  - Lieutenant Kijé Suite – 1 cornet
- Ottorino Respighi
  - Roman Festival – 3 Buccine (3 soprano)
  - Pines of Rome – 6 Buccine (2 soprano, 2 tenor, 2 bass) and 1 trumpet
  - Church Windows – trumpet
- Dmitri Shostakovich
  - Festive Overture – 4 horns, 3 trumpets and 3 trombones
  - Song of the Forests – 6 trumpets and 6 trombones
- Richard Strauss
  - Eine Alpensinfonie – 12 horns, 2 trumpets and 2 trombones
  - Ein Heldenleben – 3 trumpets
- Pyotr Ilyich Tchaikovsky
  - 1812 Overture – "Open" instrumentation consisting of "any extra brass instruments" available.
- Frank Ticheli
  - An American Elegy – 1 trumpet
- Giuseppe Verdi
  - Falstaff – an offstage guitar player performs a part which Alice, holding a lute onstage, pretends to play
  - Requiem – 4 trumpets
  - Luisa Miller – 4 horns
- William Walton
  - Belshazzar's Feast – 2 bands, each including 3 trumpets, 3 trombones and tuba

== Choirs ==
- In Gustav Holst's The Planets, the last movement, Neptune, uses two offstage women's choirs to create a mysterious effect. The choirs gradually fade away in volume, ending the piece.

== See also ==
- Offstage musicians and singers in popular music (used to fill out a band's sound)
