= Cornicen =

Junior officer in the Roman army

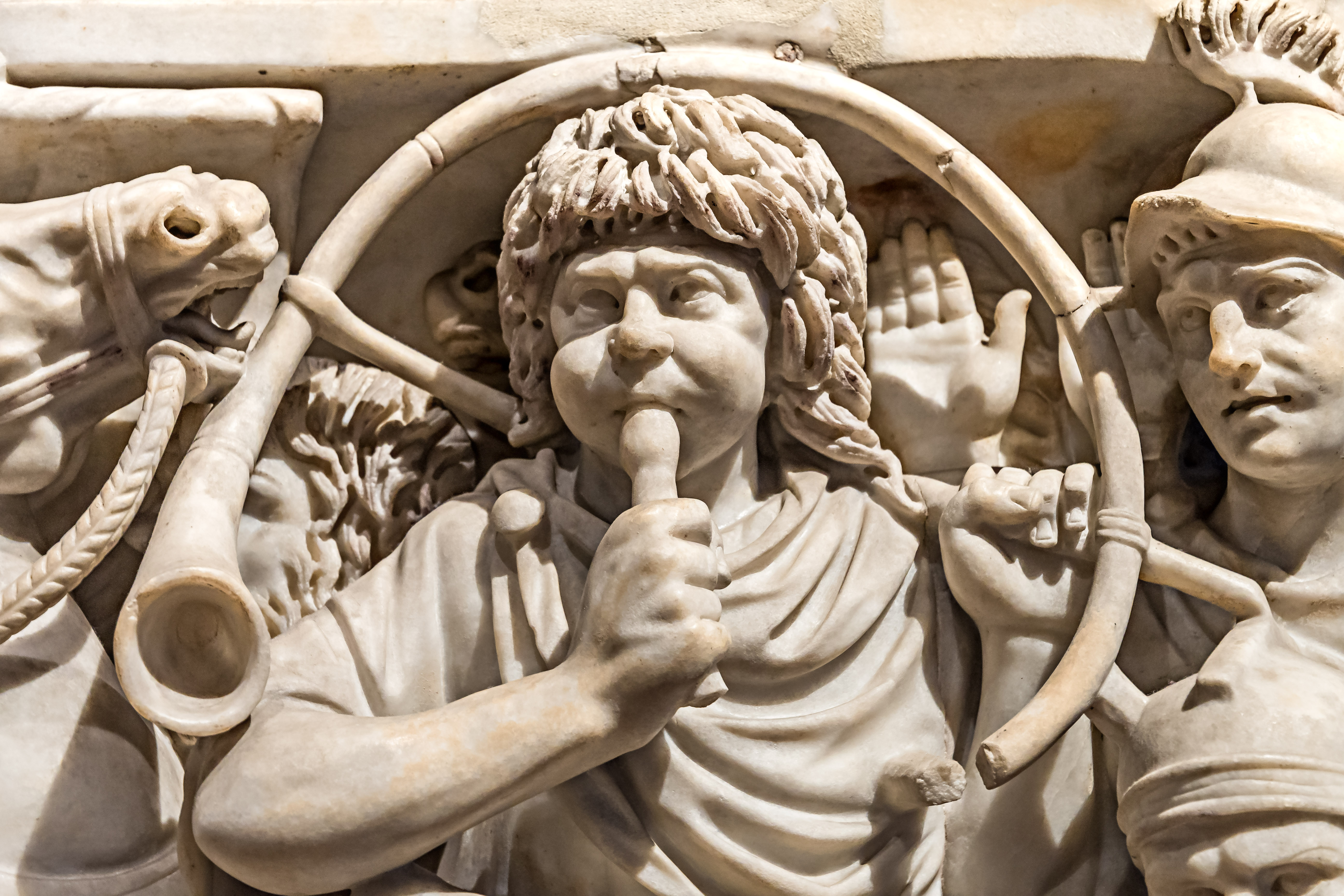
Cornicen on the Ludovisi Battle sarcophagus (3rd century)

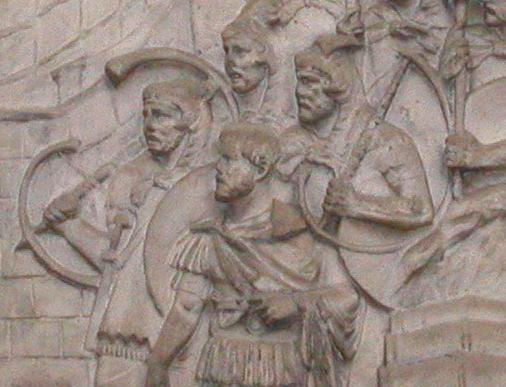
Cornicines on Trajan's Column

A cornicen (pl.: cornicines) was a junior officer in the Roman army. The cornicen's job was to signal salutes to officers and sound orders to the legions. The cornicines played the cornu (making him an aeneator). Cornicines always marched at the head of the centuries, with the tesserary and the signifer. The cornicines were also used as assistants to a centurion (like an optio). The cornicen was a duplicary or a soldier who got double the basic pay of the legionary.

== The cornicen ==
The late Roman writer Vegetius in his work De re militari wrote:

The music of the legion consists of Roman tuba, cornu and buccinae. The trumpet sounds the charge and the retreat. The cornets are used only to regulate the motions of the colors; the trumpets serve when the soldiers are ordered out to any work without the colors; but in time of action, the trumpets and cornets sound together. The classicum, which is a particular sound of the buccina or horn, is appropriated to the commander-in-chief and is used in the presence of the general, or at the execution of a soldier, as a mark of its being done by his authority. The ordinary guards and outposts are always mounted and relieved by the sound of trumpet, which also directs the motions of the soldiers on working parties and on field days. The cornets sound whenever the colors are to be struck or planted. These rules must be punctually observed in all exercises and reviews so that the soldiers may be ready to obey them in action without hesitation according to the general's orders either to charge or halt, to pursue the enemy or to retire. For reason will convince us that what is necessary to be performed in the heat of action should constantly be practiced in the leisure of peace.

== See also ==
- Music of ancient Rome
