= Lituus =

Roman augural staff

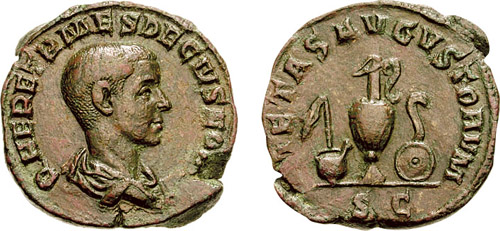
A lituus (reverse, right, over the patera) as cult instrument, in this coin celebrating the pietas of the Roman Emperor Herennius Etruscus.

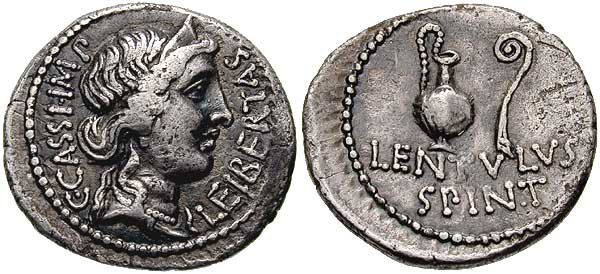
A lituus is shown on the reverse and to the right on this ancient coin.

The word lituus originally meant a curved augural staff, or a curved war-trumpet in the ancient Latin language. This Latin word continued in use through the 18th century as an alternative to the vernacular names of various musical instruments.

== Roman ritual wand ==
The lituus was a crooked wand (similar in shape to the top part of some Western European crosiers) used as a cult instrument in ancient Roman religion by augurs to mark out a ritual space in the sky (a templum). The passage of birds through this templum indicated divine favor or disfavor for a given undertaking.

The lituus was also used as a symbol of office for the college of the augurs to mark them as a priestly group.

== Music instrument ==
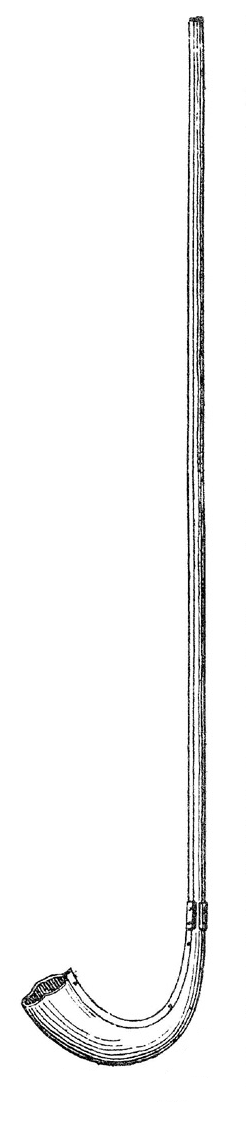
Etrusco-Roman lituus (instrument)

=== Antiquity ===
The ancient lituus was an Etruscan high-pitched brass instrument, which was straight but bent at the end, in the shape of a letter J, similar to the Gallic carnyx. It was later used by the Romans, especially for processional music and as a signalling horn in the army. For the Roman military it may have been particular to the cavalry, and both the Etruscan and Roman versions were always used in pairs, like the prehistoric lurer. Unlike the Roman litui, the Etruscan instruments had detachable mouthpieces and in general appear to have been longer. The name lituus is Latin, thought to have been derived from an Etruscan cultic word describing a soothsayer's wand modelled on a shepherd's crook and associated with sacrifice and favourable omens. Earlier Roman and Etruscan depictions show the instrument used in processions, especially funeral processions. Players of the lituus were called liticines, though the name of the instrument appears to have been loosely used (by poets, not likely by soldiers) to describe other military brass instruments, such as the tuba or the buccina. In 17th-century Germany a variant of the bent ancient lituus was still used as a signalling horn by nightwatchmen.

=== Medieval period ===
From the end of the 10th through the 13th centuries, chroniclers of the Crusades used the word lituus vaguely—along with the Classical Latin names for other Roman military Trumpets and horns, such as the tuba, cornu, and buccina and the more up-to-date French term trompe—to describe various instruments employed in the Christian armies. However, it is impossible to determine what sort of instrument might have been meant, and it is unlikely their litui were the same as the Etrusco-Roman instrument.

In the early 15th century, Jean de Gerson listed the lituus among those string instruments that were sounded by beating or striking, either with the fingernails, a plectrum, or a stick. Other instruments Gerson names in this category are the cythara, guiterna, psalterium, timpanum, and campanula.

=== Modern era ===
Throughout the postclassical era the name lituus continued to be used when discussing ancient and Biblical instruments, but with reference to contemporary musical practice in the Renaissance it usually referred to "bent horns" made of wood, particularly the crumhorn and the cornett. The crumhorn was especially associated with the lituus because of the similarity of its shape. The equation of the crumhorn with the lituus was especially strong among German writers. A 1585 English translation of Hadrianus Junius's Nomenclator defines lituus as "a writhen or crooked trumpet winding in and out; a shaulme" (i.e., shawm), but a polyglot edition of the same book published in 1606 demonstrates how differently the term might have been understood in various languages at that time: German Schalmey, Krumme Trommeten, Krumhorn; Dutch Schalmeye; French Claron, ou cleron; Italian Trombetta bastarda; Spanish Trompeta curua, ò bastarda. The early Baroque composer and author Michael Praetorius used the word as a Latin equivalent of the German "Schallmeye" (shawm) or for the "Krumbhoerner" (crumhorns)—in the latter case also offering the Italian translations storti, and cornamuti torti.

A more particular term, lituus alpinus, was used in 1555 by the Swiss naturalist Conrad Gessner when he published the earliest detailed description of the Alphorn: "nearly eleven feet long, made from two pieces of wood slightly curved and hollowed out, fitted together and skillfully bound with osiers".

A study made of Swedish dictionaries found that during the seventeenth century lituus was variously translated as sinka (= German Zink, cornett), krumhorn, krum trumeta (curved trumpet), claret, or horn.

In the eighteenth century the word once again came to describe contemporary brass instruments, such as in a 1706 inventory from the Ossegg monastery in Bohemia, which equates it with the hunting horn: "litui vulgo Waldhörner duo ex tono G". Nevertheless, in 1732 Johann Gottfried Walther referred back to Renaissance and Medieval definitions, defining lituus as "a cornett, formerly it also signified a shawm or, in Italian tubam curvam, a HeerHorn". (Heerhorn or Herhorn was a Middle High German name for a metal, slightly curved military signal horn, approximately five feet long, played with the bell turned upward.) In 1738, the well-known horn player Anton Joseph Hampel served as a godfather at the baptism of a daughter of the renowned Dresden lutenist Silvius Leopold Weiss. In the baptismal register he was described as "Lituista Regius"—"royal lituus player". In the second half of the 18th century the lituus was described in one source as a Latin name for the trumpet or horn.

A number of musical compositions from the Baroque era specify an instrument by the Latin name lituus, including Bach's motet O Jesu Christ, meins Lebens Licht (BWV 118), a partita attributed to Jan Josef Ignác Brentner, as well as several masses and concertos by Johann Valentin Rathgeber. Scientists from Edinburgh University tried to recreate the lituus used by Bach in May 2009, in the form of a long wooden trumpet, assuming the word did not refer to a modern horn but to an instrument that had been out of use for 300 years.
