= Roman Festivals (Respighi) =

Symphonic poem by Ottorino Respighi

Feste Romane Roman Festivals
- Tone poem by Ottorino Respighi
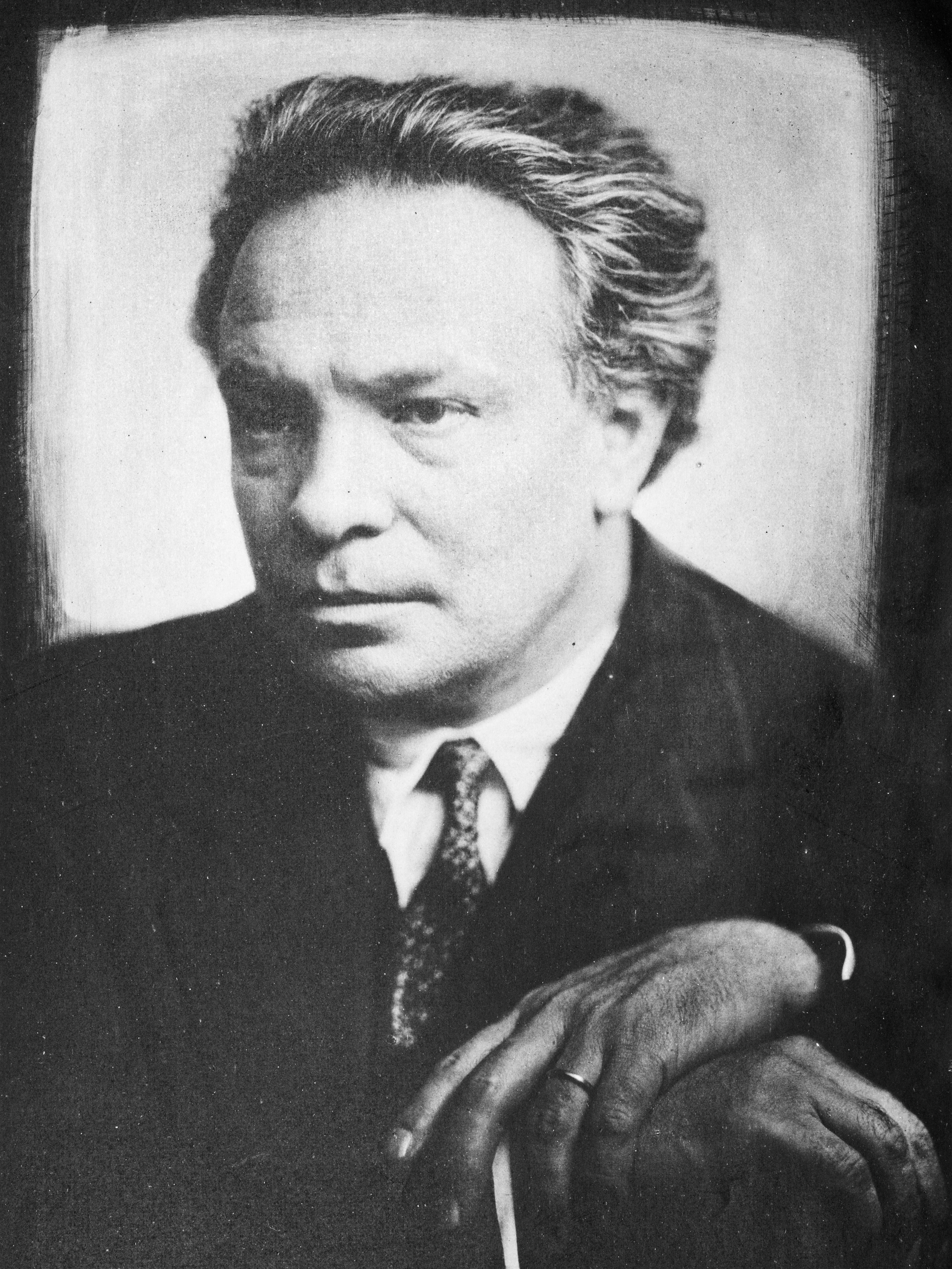
- Respighi in 1927
- Catalogue: P 157
- Composed: 1928
- Duration: Approx. 25 minutes
- Movements: 4

Premiere
- Date: 21 February 1929
- Location: New York City, United States
- Conductor: Arturo Toscanini
- Performers: New York Philharmonic

Roman Festivals (Italian: Feste Romane), P 157 is a tone poem in four movements for orchestra completed in 1928 by the Italian composer Ottorino Respighi. It is the last of his three tone poems about Rome, following Fountains of Rome (1916) and Pines of Rome (1924), which he referred to as a triptych. Each movement depicts a scene of celebration in ancient and contemporary Rome, specifically gladiators battling to the death, the Christian Jubilee, a harvest and hunt festival, and a festival in the Piazza Navona. Musically, the piece is the longest and most demanding of Respighi's Roman trilogy.

The premiere was held on 21 February 1929 at Carnegie Hall in New York City, with Arturo Toscanini conducting the New York Philharmonic. The piece was published by Casa Ricordi in the same year.

== Overview ==
Having completed the work, Respighi felt that he had incorporated the "maximum of orchestral sonority and colour" from the orchestra and could no longer write such large scale pieces. It was at this time that he started to favour compositions for smaller ensembles. Although Roman Festivals is generally considered as less successful than its two predecessors, conductor and Respighi interpreter Yan Pascal Tortelier points to the "really inspired mix of sophisticated orchestration, chromaticism, harmony and powerful driving rhythms" used in the piece, and judges "La Befana" as "exuberant, almost orgiastic" and "much more varied and satisfying musically" than the similarly eruptive final movement of Pines of Rome.

== Movements ==
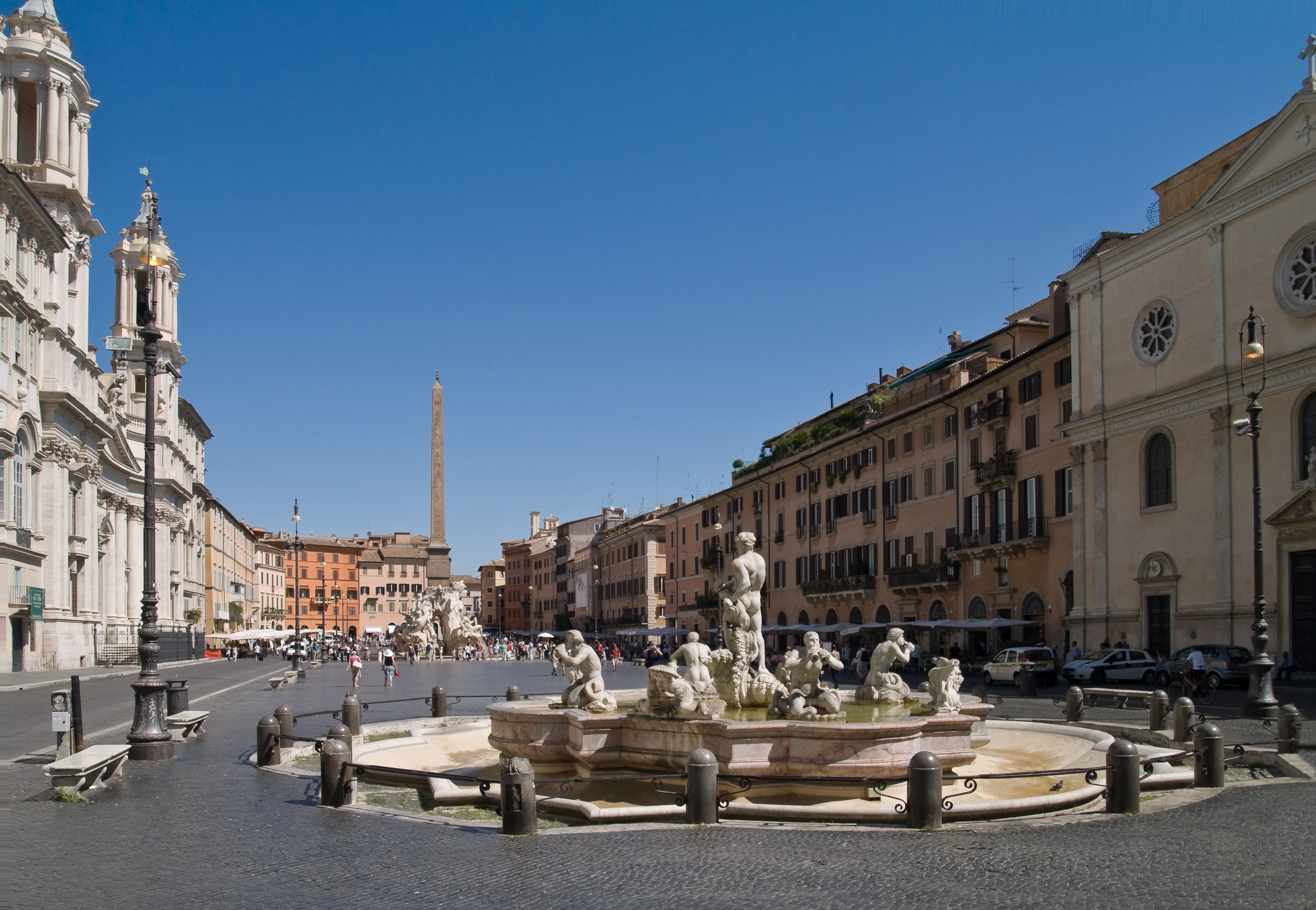
The final movement depicts a celebratory scene in Piazza Navona

The piece consists of four movements, for which Respighi wrote programmatic notes describing each scene.

1. "Circenses" ("Circus Games" or "Circus Maximus")
2. "Il Giubileo" ("The Jubilee")
3. "L'Ottobrata" ("The October Harvest" or "The October Festival")
4. "La Befana" ("The Epiphany")

"Circus Games" depicts the ancient contests in which gladiators battled to the death, with the sound of trumpet fanfares. Strings and woodwinds suggest the plainchant of the first Christian martyrs which are heard against the snarls of the beasts against which they are pitted. The movement ends with violent orchestral chords, complete with organ pedal, as the martyrs succumb. "The Jubilee" portrays the every-fiftieth-year festival in the Papal tradition (see Christian Jubilee). Respighi quotes the German Easter hymn, "Christ ist erstanden". Pilgrims approaching Rome catch a breath-taking view from Mt. Mario, as church bells ring in the background. "The October Harvest" represents the harvest and hunt festival in Rome. The French horn solo celebrates the harvest as bells and a mandolin portrays love serenades. "The Epiphany" takes place in the Piazza Navona. Trumpets sound again and create a festive clamour of Roman songs and dances, including a barrel organ and a drunken reveler depicted by a solo tenor trombone.

== Instrumentation ==
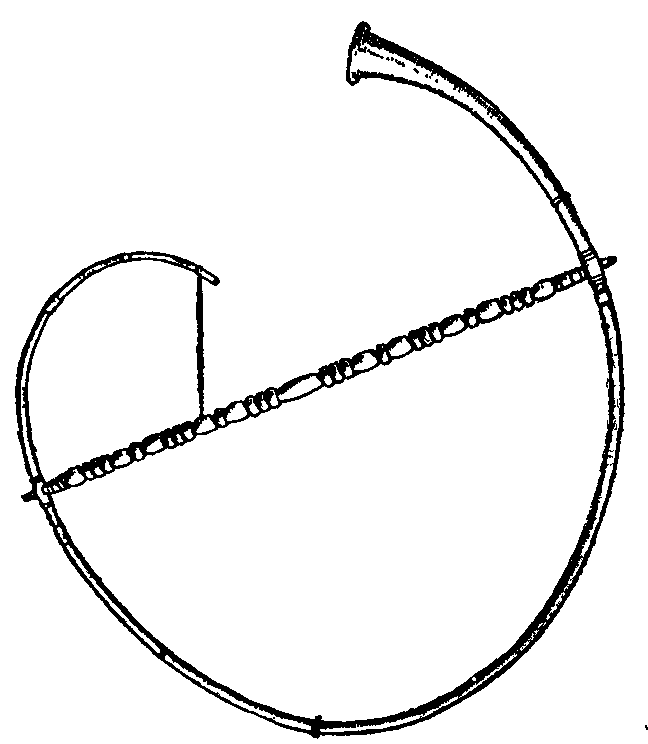
A buccina (plural: buccine)

Feste romane is scored for the following large orchestra, including some unusual instruments intended to suggest music of earlier times:

- Woodwinds: 3 flutes (3rd doubling piccolo), 2 oboes, English horn, 2 clarinets in B♭ and A, piccolo clarinet in D, bass clarinet in B♭ and A, 2 bassoons, and contrabassoon
- Brass: 4 horns in F, 4 trumpets in B♭ and A, 2 tenor trombones, bass trombone, bass tuba and 3 offstage soprano buccine in B♭^{1}
- Percussion: timpani, 2 bells, glockenspiel, 1 pair of crash cymbals, suspended cymbal, bass drum with cymbals, field drum, snare drum, ratchet, 1 set of sleigh bells, tambourine, tam-tam, triangle, high and low wood blocks (horse hooves), and xylophone
- Keyboards: piano (2 and 4 hands), and organ
- Strings: mandolin, 16-18 1st violins, 16 2nd violins, 12-14 violas, 12 cellos, and 8-10 double basses

^{1} Respighi noted that the buccine may be replaced by trumpets, a substitution which most modern orchestras make.

== Performances and recordings ==
Arturo Toscanini and the New York Philharmonic premiered the music in Carnegie Hall on 21 February 1929. Toscanini recorded it with the Philadelphia Orchestra in the Academy of Music in 1942 for RCA Victor. He recorded it again with the NBC Symphony Orchestra in Carnegie Hall in 1949, again for RCA. Both recordings were issued on LP and CD. Indeed, the 1949 performance pushed the very limits of the recording equipment of the time as Toscanini insisted the engineers capture all of the dynamics of the music, especially in "Circus Games" and "Epiphany".

The piece was first performed in Italy at the Augusteo in Rome on 17 March 1929, by the Orchestra of the Accademia di Santa Cecilia under Bernardino Molinari.

== Arrangements ==
This work was transcribed (in the original key) for the United States Marine Band by Don Patterson in 2010. This transcription was recorded on the CD Feste, conducted by Michael J. Colburn.

== Appearances ==
- The movement "Circenses" was played on BBC Radio 4 Educational Radio series in the 1980s, Roman Britain during an introduction.
- The movement "Circenses" was used in the 1947 American film Fireworks.
- The movement "Circenses" appeared in Sydney New Year's Eve in 2003/2004.
