= Pines of Rome =

Symphonic poem by Ottorino Respighi

Pini di Roma Pines of Rome
- Tone poem by Ottorino Respighi
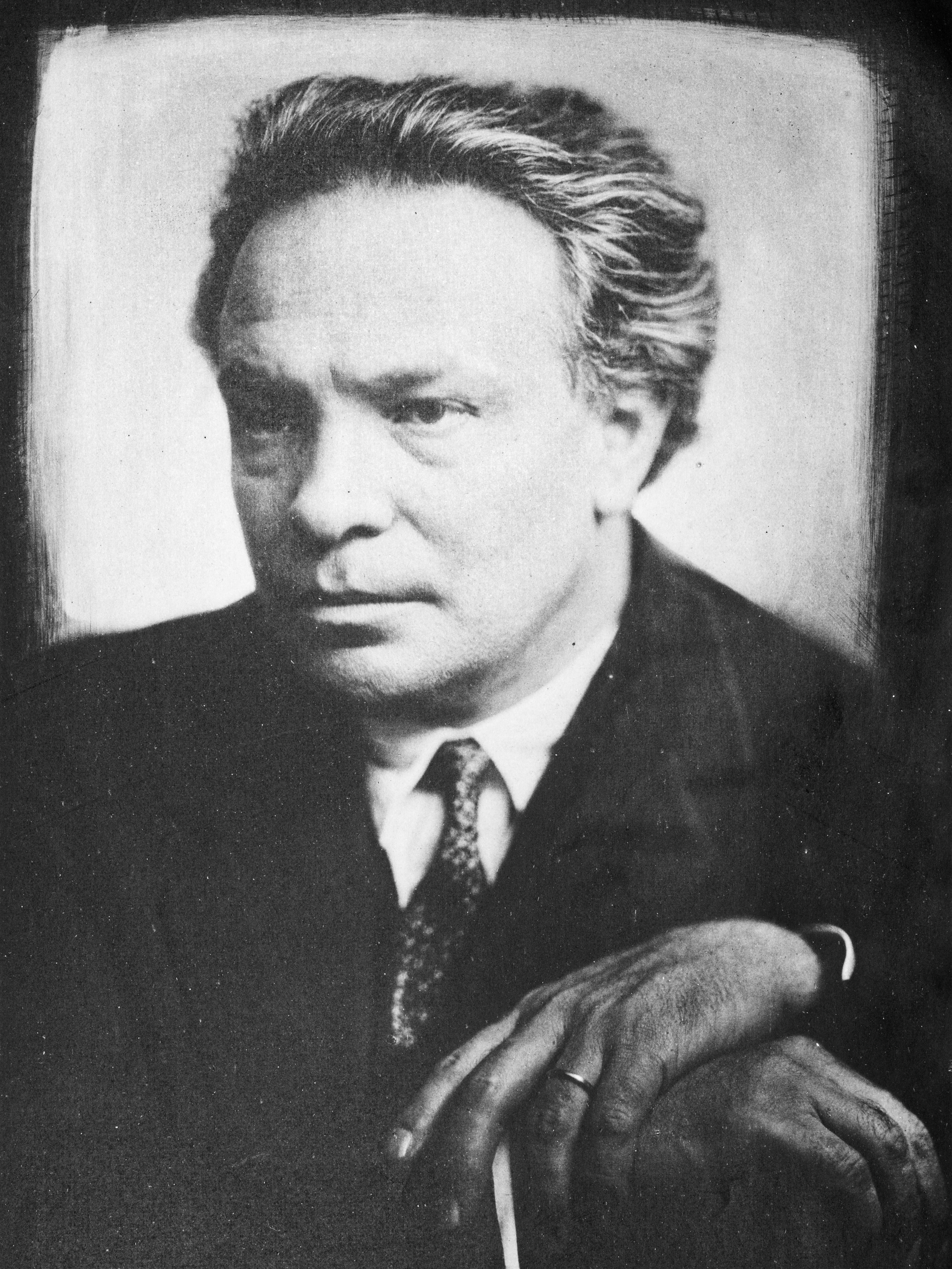
- Respighi in 1927
- Native name: I Pini di Roma
- Catalogue: P 141
- Composed: 1924
- Duration: Approx. 21 minutes
- Movements: Four

Premiere
- Date: 14 December 1924
- Location: Rome, Italy
- Conductor: Bernardino Molinari
- Performers: Augusteo Orchestra

Pines of Rome (Italian: Pini di Roma), P 141, is a tone poem in four movements for orchestra completed in 1924 by the Italian composer Ottorino Respighi. It is the second of his three tone poems about Rome, following Fontane di Roma (1916) and preceding Feste Romane (1928). Each movement depicts a setting in the city with pine trees, specifically those in the Villa Borghese gardens, near a catacomb, on the Janiculum Hill, and along the Appian Way.

The premiere was held at the Teatro Augusteo in Rome on 14 December 1924, with Bernardino Molinari conducting the Augusteo Orchestra, and the piece was published by Casa Ricordi in 1925.

== Overview ==
The piece consists of four movements, for which Respighi wrote programmatic notes describing each scene:

1. "I pini di Villa Borghese" ("The Pines of the Villa Borghese") – Allegretto vivace
2. "Pini presso una catacomba" ("Pines Near a Catacomb") – Lento
3. "I pini del Gianicolo" ("The Pines of the Janiculum") – Lento
4. "I pini della via Appia" ("The Pines of the Appian Way") – Tempo di marcia

Respighi completed I Pini di Roma in the summer of 1924, after he had "conceived, started and restarted" work on the piece in the course of several years. Having relocated from his hometown of Bologna to Rome in 1913, Respighi said that the city's "marvellous fountains" and "umbrella-like pines that appear in every part of the horizon" were two characteristics that "[have] spoken to my imagination above all". This influence resulted in the first of his three tone poems about Rome, the Fontane di Roma (1916), which brought him international fame.

Authors Rehding and Dolan observed that the piece is cyclical in nature in different ways; the Villa Borghese gardens, the Janiculum hill, and the Appian Way pinpoint a counter-clockwise tour around Rome's perimeter, and the four movements progress from day to night, and ending with dawn. The setting of each movement goes back in time, from children playing in the contemporary city to the era of the catacombs from the early Christian period, before it concludes at the time of the Roman Republic. The piece also represents progressing through time, beginning with children playing and ending with grown men in uniform. All the while, the Janiculum hill is dedicated to Janus, the god of beginnings, endings, and transitions, and has two faces, one of which looks forward and the other backward in time.

== Movements ==
=== I. "I pini di Villa Borghese" ===
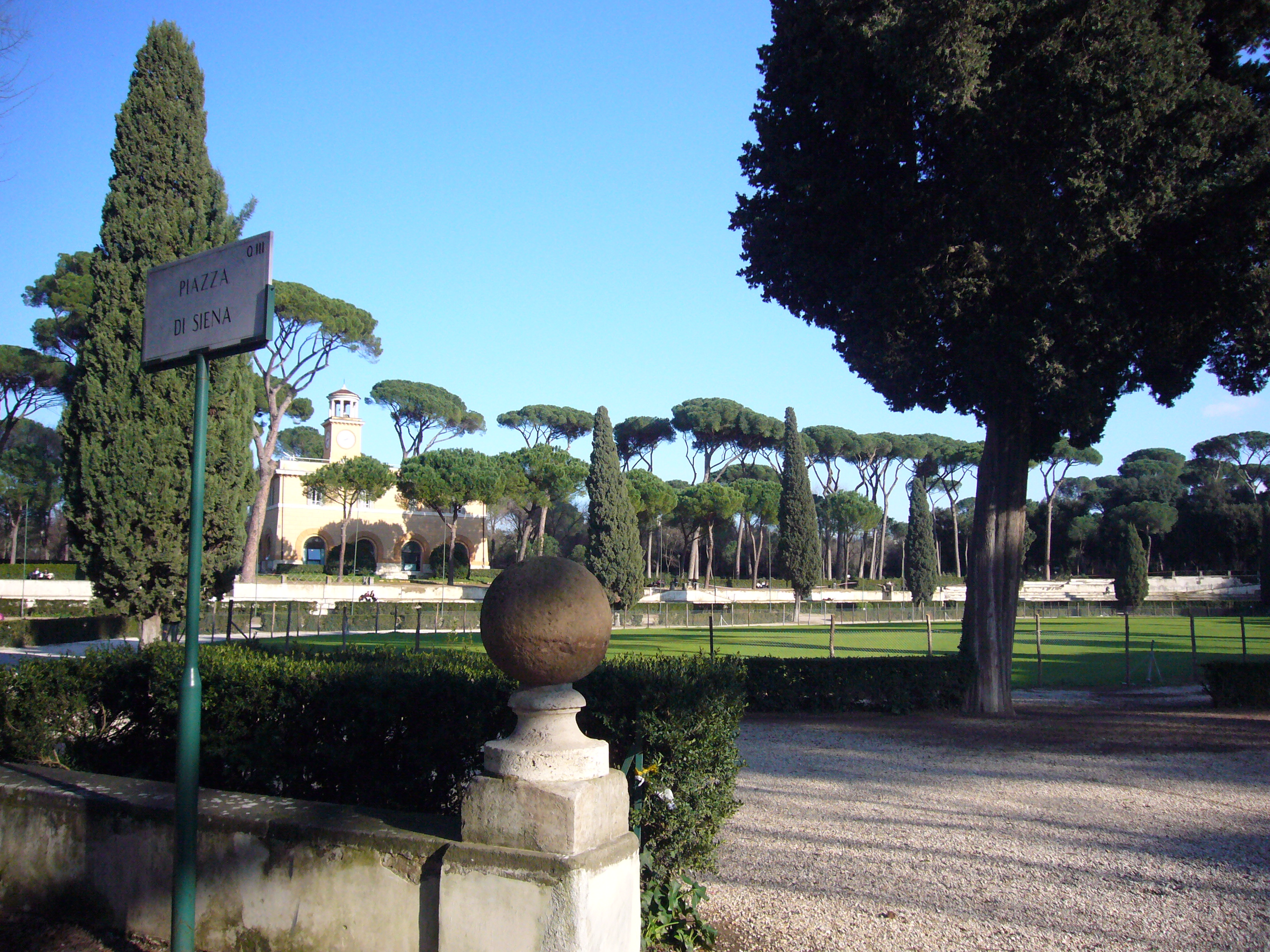
Pine trees in the Villa Borghese gardens

The first movement portrays children playing by the pine trees in the Villa Borghese gardens, dancing the Italian equivalent of the nursery rhyme "Ring a Ring o' Roses" and "mimicking marching soldiers and battles; twittering and shrieking like swallows". The Villa Borghese, a villa located within the grounds, is a monument to the Borghese family, who dominated the city in the early seventeenth century. Respighi's wife Elsa recalled a moment in late 1920, when Respighi asked her to sing the melodies of songs that she sang while playing in the gardens as a child as he transcribed them, and found he had incorporated the tunes in the first movement.

=== II. "Pini presso una catacomba" ===
In the second movement, the children suddenly disappear and shadows of pine trees that overhang the entrance of a Roman catacomb dominate. It is a majestic dirge, conjuring up the picture of a solitary chapel in the deserted Campagna; open land, with a few pine trees silhouetted against the sky. A hymn is heard (specifically the Kyrie ad libitum 1, Clemens Rector; and the Sanctus from Mass IX, Cum jubilo), the sound rising and sinking again into some sort of catacomb, the cavern in which the dead are immured. An offstage trumpet plays the Sanctus hymn. Lower orchestral instruments, plus the organ pedal at 16′ and 32′ pitch, suggest the subterranean nature of the catacombs, while the trombones and horns represent priests chanting.

=== III. "I pini del Gianicolo" ===
The end of the third movement features this recording of the song of a nightingale which Respighi incorporated into the score.

The third is a nocturne set on the Janiculum Hill and a full moon shining on the pines that grow on it. Respighi called for the clarinet solo at the beginning to be played "come in sogno" ("As if in a dream").

The movement is known for the sound of a nightingale that Respighi requested to be played on a phonograph during its ending, which was considered innovative for its time and the first such instance in music. In the original score, Respighi calls for a specific gramophone record to be played–"Il canto dell'Usignolo" ("Song of a Nightingale, No. 2") from disc No. R. 6105, the Italian pressing of the disc released across Europe by the Gramophone Record label between 1911 and 1913. The original pressing was released in Germany in 1910, and was recorded by Karl Reich and Franz Hampe. It is the first ever commercial recording of a live bird. Respighi also called for the disc to be played on a Brunswick Panatrope record player. There are incorrect claims that Respighi recorded the nightingale himself, or that the nightingale was recorded in the yard of the McKim Building of the American Academy in Rome, also situated on Janiculum hill.

=== IV. "I pini della via Appia" ===
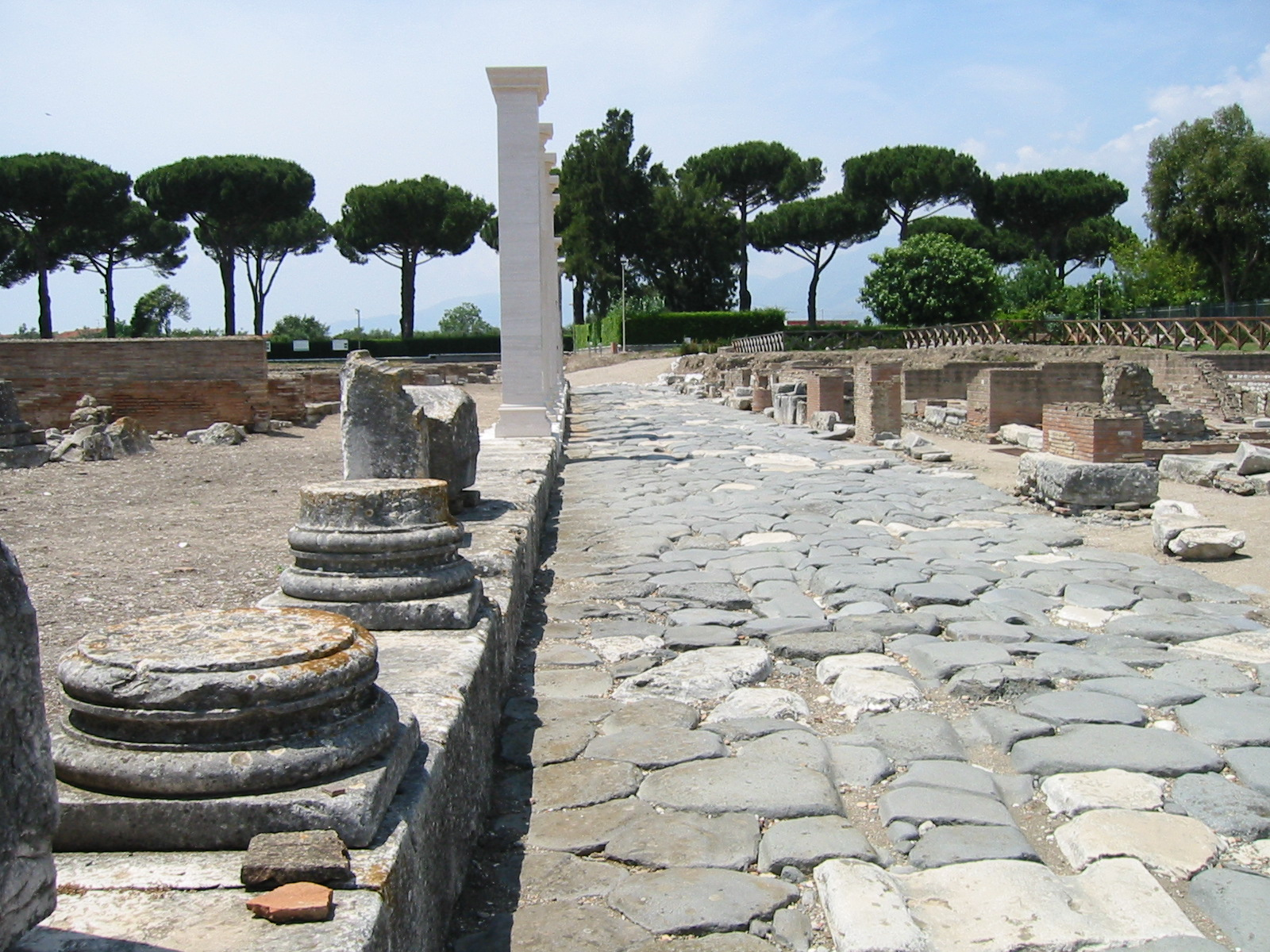
Pines on the Appian Way

Respighi recalls the past glories of the Roman Empire in a representation of dawn on the great military road leading into Rome. The final movement portrays pine trees along the Appian Way (Latin and Italian: Via Appia) in the misty dawn, as a triumphant legion advances along the road in the brilliance of the newly-rising sun. Respighi wanted the ground to tremble under the footsteps of his army and he instructs the organ to play bottom B♭ on the 8′, 16′ and 32′ organ pedals. The score calls for six buccine – ancient circular trumpets that are usually represented by modern flugelhorns, and which are sometimes played offstage. Trumpets peal and the consular army rises in triumph to the Capitoline Hill. One day prior to the final rehearsal, Respighi revealed to Elsa that the crescendo of "I Pini della Via Appia" made him feel "'an I-don’t-know-what' in the pit of his stomach", and the first time that a work he had imagined turned out how he wanted it.

== Instrumentation ==
The score of Pines of Rome calls for a large orchestra consisting of the following:

Woodwinds

3 flutes (third doubling piccolo)
2 oboes
English horn
2 clarinets in B♭ and A
bass clarinet in B-flat and A
2 bassoons
contrabassoon
Brass
4 horns
3 trumpets
offstage trumpet in C
2 tenor trombones
bass trombone
bass tuba
6 offstage buccine in B♭ (marked "o flicorno": two sopranos, two tenors, two basses; usually played on flugelhorns and saxhorns)

Percussion

timpani

bass drum
snare drum
1 pair of crash cymbals
suspended cymbal
2 small cymbals
tam-tam
triangle
ratchet
tambourine
gramophone
glockenspiel

Keyboards
organ
piano
celesta
Strings
harp

16-18 1st violins
16 2nd violins
12 violas
12 cellos
8-10 double basses

== Performances and recordings ==
I. Pines of the Villa Borghese

II. The Pines Near a Catacomb

III. The Pines of the Janiculum

IV. The Pines of the Appian Way

Pines of Rome premiered December 14, 1924 at the Teatro Augusteo in Rome, a venue built above the mausoleum of Augustus, the first Roman emperor. Bernardino Molinari conducted the Orchestra dell'Augusteo to a positive reception. Elsa remembered the final measures of the piece were "drowned by frenetic applause" from the audience, and a second performance was arranged on 28 December to a sold-out venue. The American premiere took place on January 14, 1926, during Arturo Toscanini's first concert as conductor of the New York Philharmonic. Toscanini also conducted the piece at his final performance with the orchestra in 1945. Respighi, who had arrived in the United States to embark on a concert tour in December 1925, conducted the work with the Philadelphia Orchestra a day after Toscanini's American premiere.

Pines of Rome is easily the most recorded of all Respighi's works, and is often released as part of his trilogy of Roman-inspired works. As of 2018, more than 100 recordings of the piece are available on physical media.

Lorenzo Molajoli and Ettore Panizza both made recordings with the Milan Symphony Orchestra; Molajoli's recording was released by Columbia Records and Panizza's recording was released by Odeon and Decca Records. In 1935, Piero Coppola and the Paris Conservatory Orchestra recorded the music for EMI, released by in the UK by the His Master's Voice, and in the US by RCA Victor on 78 rpm discs. Toscanini recorded the music with the NBC Symphony Orchestra in Carnegie Hall in 1953. The music was recorded in stereophonic sound by Fritz Reiner and the Chicago Symphony Orchestra in Orchestra Hall in 1959–60, also for RCA alongside Claude Debussy's La Mer.

== Use in film and elsewhere ==
- The piece was used in Fireworks (1947), an avant-garde film directed by Kenneth Anger.
- Movements I, II and IV were used throughout of A Movie (1958) by Bruce Conner. The whole composition was used as a soundtrack for Morgan Fisher's Another Movie (2018), a reinterpretation of Conner's film in which the screen is black, except for the third movement, which depicts the original nocturne, a full moon behind the pine trees, in a single shot.
- The opening of the work was used at the beginning of the 1983 song "City of Love" released on the album 90125 by the rock band Yes.
- An edited version was used to accompany flying, frolicking humpback whales in the Disney film Fantasia 2000. The second movement is omitted, along with the nightingale's song in the third and the English horn solo in the fourth.
- Fragments of the second and fourth movements were used in the soundtrack of The Tragedy of Man (1983–2011) by Marcell Jankovics.
