= Bernardino Molinari =

Italian conductor

Bernardino Molinari (11 April 1880 – 25 December 1952) was an Italian conductor.

Molinari in 1946

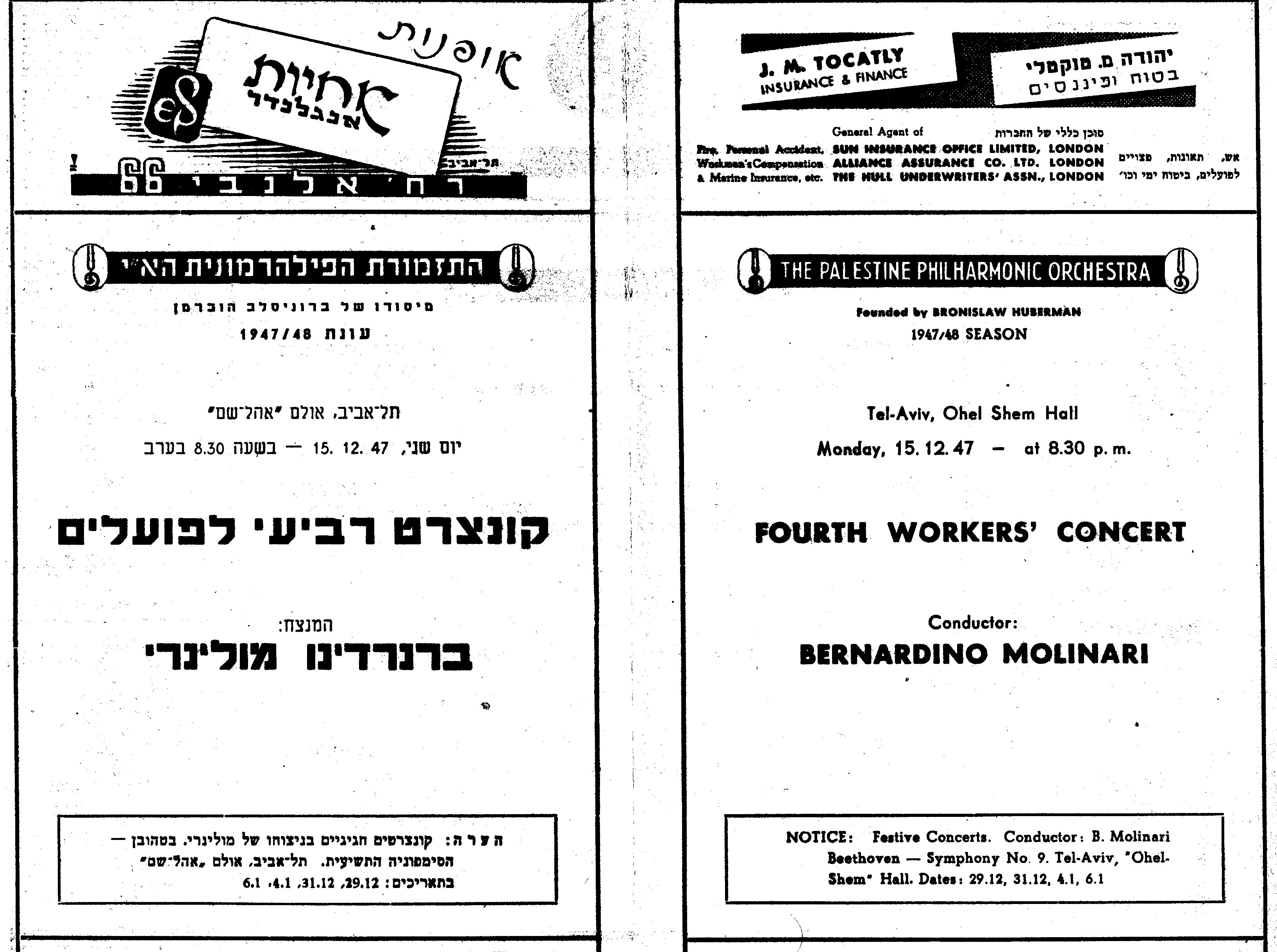
Cover of a concert program of The Palestine Philharmonic Orchestra (Tel Aviv, 15 December 1947). Conductor: Bernardino Molinari

Molinari studied under Renzi and Falchi at the Accademia (then "Liceo Musicale") of Santa Cecilia in his home town of Rome.

In 1912, he was appointed artistic director of the Augusteo Orchestra, Rome, later renamed l'Orchestra dell'Accademia Nazionale di Santa Cecilia, a position he held until the end of the Second World War. Since this was then, like now, the leading symphony orchestra position in Italy, it aroused the envy of several rivals. He was engaged as a guest conductor, including for the St. Louis Symphony in 1930.

After the liberation of Rome on 4 June 1944, Molinari was contested by the public, in particular during two concerts held on 9 and 12 July, for his involvement with the Fascist regime. He had to suspend the performance and, since then, he was able to conduct the Orchestra of the Theatre of Opera in Rome only.

In 1945, he arrived in Palestine and conducted the Israeli Philharmonic Orchestra, then became its musical advisor. The performance of the Korngold violin concerto with David Grunschlag as soloist was critically acclaimed.

According to some, his arrangement of the Israeli national anthem Hatikvah was praised by Leonard Bernstein. His version serves most Israeli performances of the piece.

Molinari guest-conducted at all the important musical centres in Europe and the Americas. Unlike most Italian conductors, he seldom conducted opera.

Composer Robert Starer tells of his experience as a young harpist in the Palestine Orchestra in the 1940s:

I sat behind [my] harp, glanced at the most intricate harp part I had ever encountered, and looked with a heavily beating heart at the conductor, Bernardino Molinari, a fine, experienced maestro. He must have sensed how I felt, for he gave me every single cue and somehow helped me to get through the first movement without any noticeable mishap…"

== Notable premieres ==
=== Concert ===
- Ottorino Respighi: Sinfonia Drammatica, Augusteo, Rome, 25 January 1915
- Ottorino Respighi: Pini di Roma, Augusteo, Rome, 4 December 1924
- On 15 December 1947 Molinari directed Josef Tal's Exodus premiere with the Philharmonic Orchestra in Tel-Aviv.
- Samuel Barber: Symphony in One Movement, 13 December 1936

=== Recording ===
- Antonio Vivaldi: Four Seasons, Parlophone/Cetra 1942
- Ottorino Respighi: Fontane di Roma, Odeon, ca.1942

== Sources ==
- Mucci, E.: Bernardino Molinari. Lanciano, 1941.
- Casini, Claudio (2001). "Molinari, Bernardino". Grove Music Online (8th ed.). Oxford University Press. ISBN 978-1-56159-263-0. (subscription, Wikilibrary access, or UK public library membership required)
