= Buccina =

Ancient Roman war horn

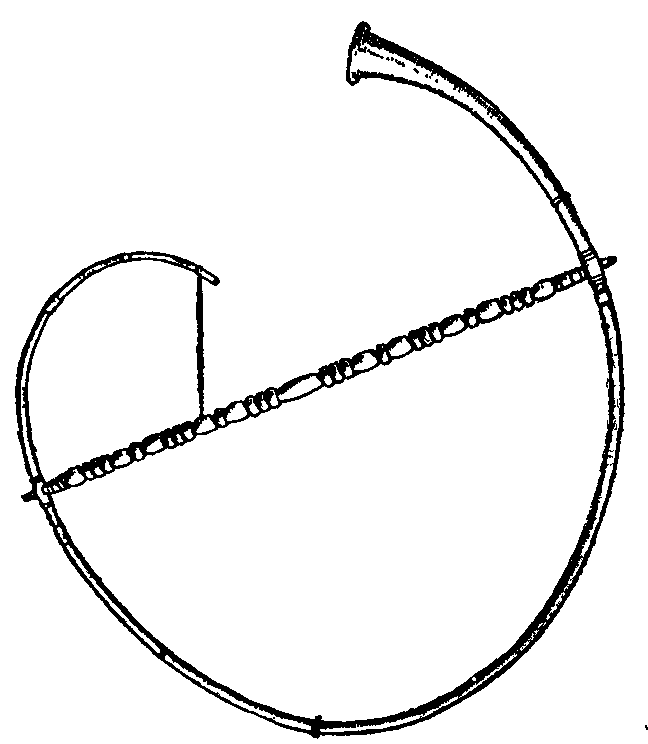
Buccina

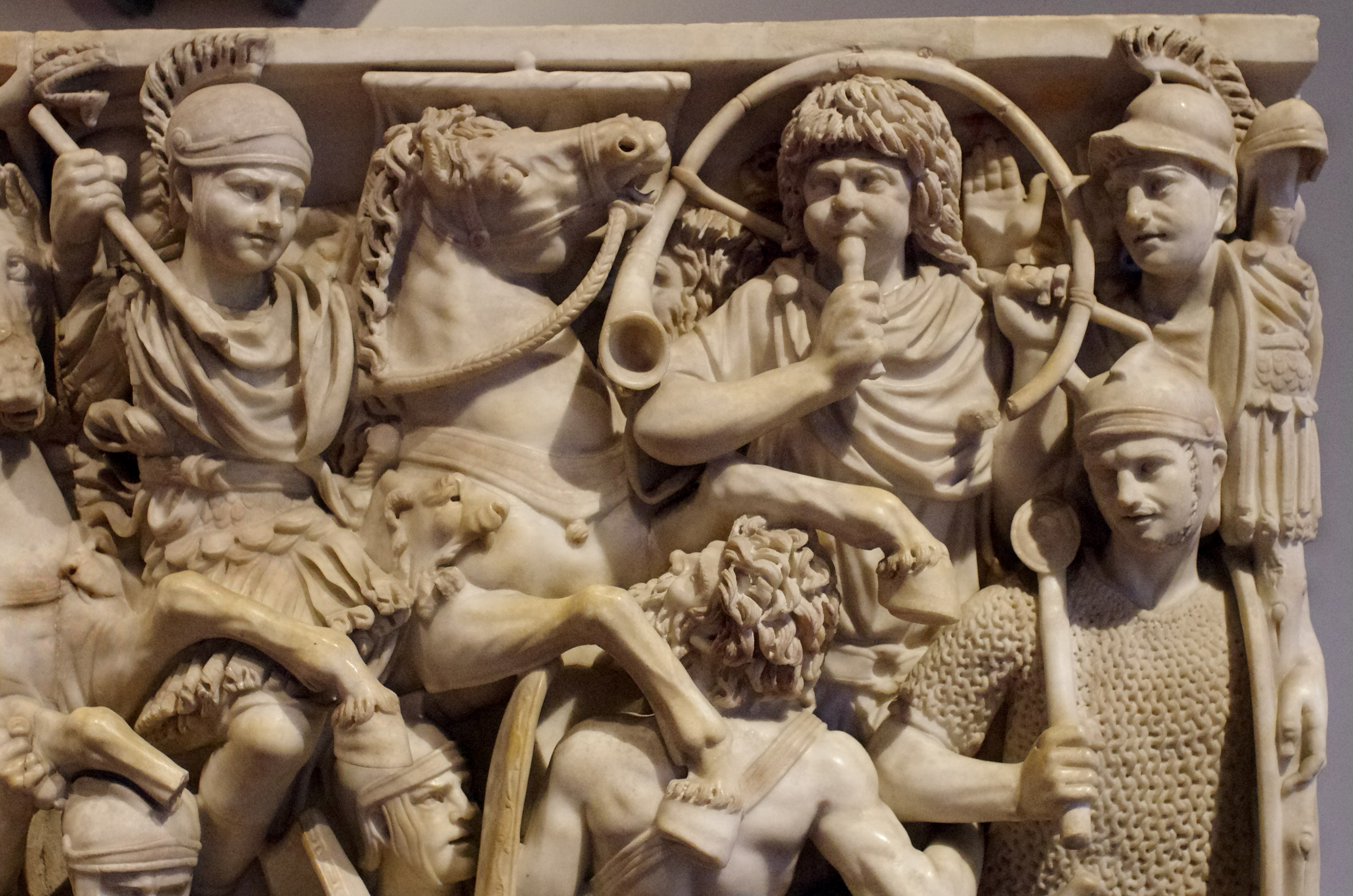
Ludovisi Battle sarcophagus: Detail roman wearing mail, and above him a cornicen, a junior officer who communicated signals with the military horn or buccina

A buccina (Latin: buccina) or bucina (Latin: būcina; Ancient Greek: βυκάνη), anglicized buccin or bucine, is a brass instrument that was used in the ancient Roman army, similar to the cornu. An aeneator who blew a buccina was called a "buccinator" or "bucinator" (Latin: buccinātor, būcinātor).

== Design ==
It was originally designed as a tube made of either bronze or shells. However, as time went on more materials started to be used. It measured 3.4 to 3.7 meters (11 to 12 ft) in length, of narrow cylindrical bore, and played by means of a cup-shaped mouthpiece. The tube is bent round upon itself from the mouthpiece to the bell in the shape of a broad C and is strengthened by means of a bar across the curve, which the performer grasps while playing to steady the instrument; the bell curves over his head or shoulder.

== Usage ==
The buccina was used for the announcement of night watches, to summon soldiers by means of the special signal known as classicum, and to give orders. Frontinus relates that a Roman general, who had been surrounded by the enemy, escaped during the night by means of the stratagem of leaving behind him a buccinator (trumpeter), who sounded the watches throughout the night.

In the final section of his orchestral work Pini di Roma (Pines of Rome), Respighi calls for six instruments of different ranges notated as "Buccine" (Italian plural), although he expected them to be played on modern saxhorns or flugelhorns. He also calls for three in the opening movement of his Feste romane (Roman Festivals), but again notes that they may be replaced by trumpets.

== History ==
The instrument is the ancestor of both the trumpet and the trombone; the German word for "trombone", Posaune, is linguistically derived from Buccina. The buccina was revived during the French Revolution, along with the "tuba curva". Both instruments were first used in the music that François Joseph Gossec composed for the translation of the remains of Voltaire to the Pantheon on 11 July 1791.
