= Cornu (horn) =

Ancient Roman brass instrument

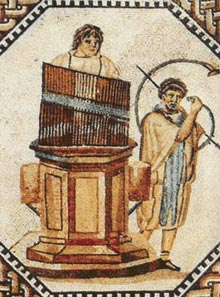
Cornu (right) and water pipe organ (left) (hydraulis) on a mosaic from Nennig, Germany

A cornu or cornum (Latin: cornū, cornūs or cornum, "horn", sometimes translated misleadingly as "cornet"; pl.: cornua) was an ancient Roman brass instrument about 3 m (9.8 ft) long in the shape of a letter 'G'. The instrument was braced by a crossbar that stiffened the structure and provided a means of supporting its weight on the player's shoulder. Some specimens survive in the archaeological record, two from the ruins of Pompeii.

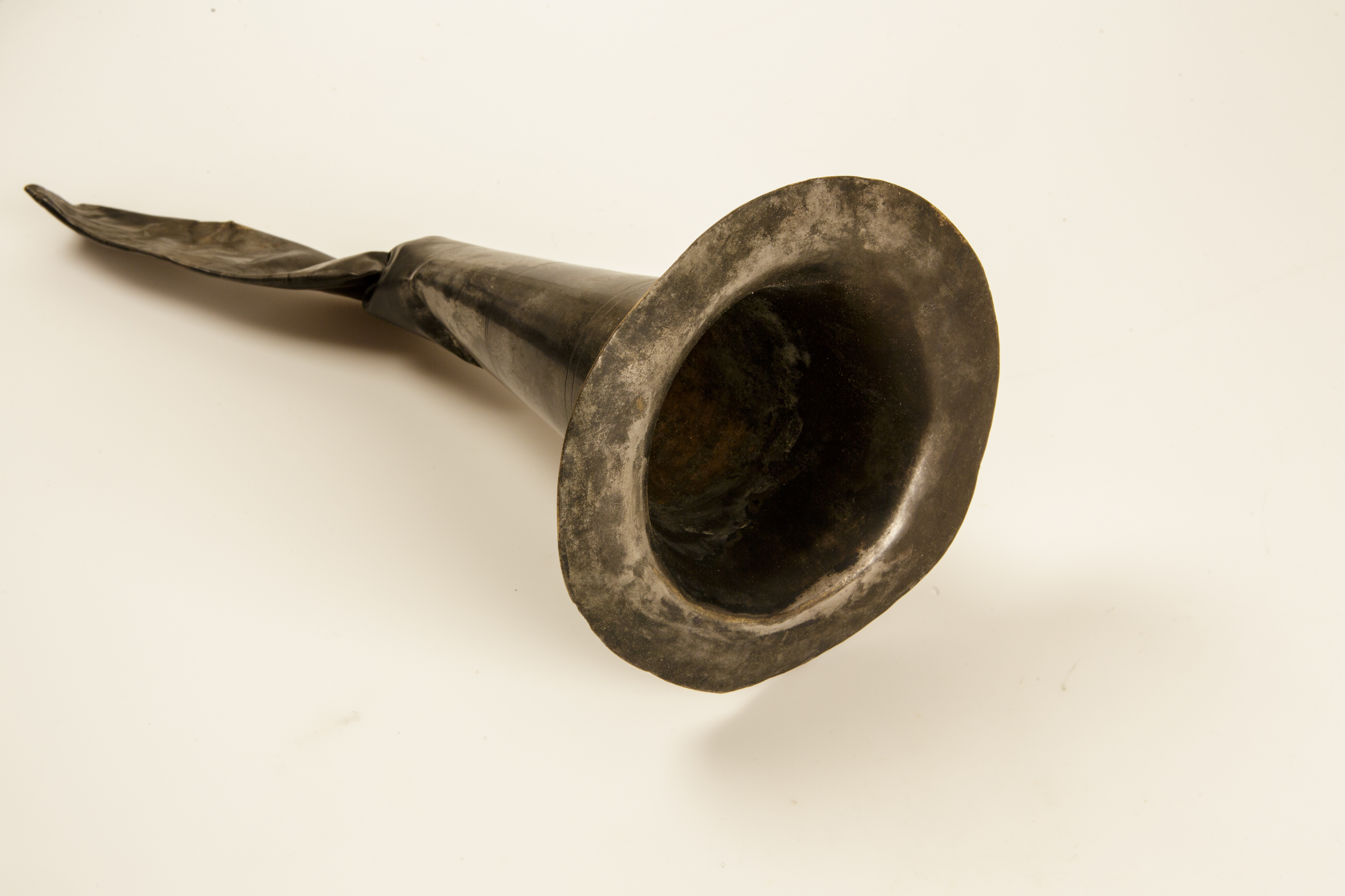
Army signal horn (cornu); Roman period; found in Alphen aan den Rijn, the Netherlands

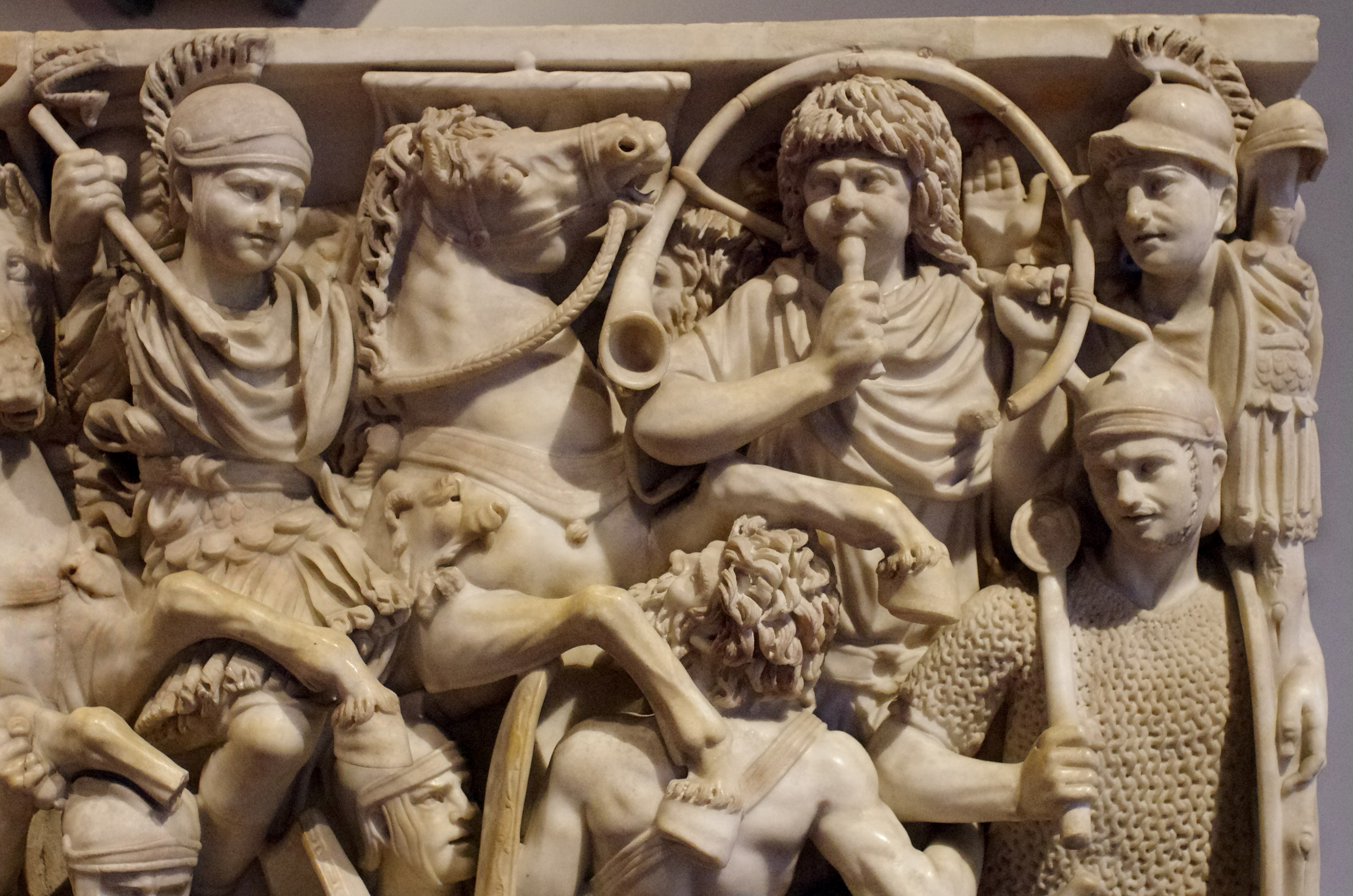
Ludovisi Battle sarcophagus: Detail roman wearing mail, and above him a cornicen, a junior officer who communicated signals with the cornu (horn) or buccina

The cornu may be difficult to distinguish from the buccina. It was used by the Roman army for communicating orders to troops in battle. In Roman art, the cornu appears among the instruments that accompany games (ludi) or gladiator combat in the arena, as on the Zliten mosaic.

== History and usage ==
It was invented by the Etruscans for use in their funeral processions and military. Roman artistic representations of the cornu are typically realistic. While Etruscan art usually depict the cornu in use alongside the lituus. It was likely a status symbol in Etruscan society. The cornu was used in Roman religious rituals such as the worship of Dionysus or Cybele. It was also used in sacrifices, funerals, circus plays, gladiatorial games, and bacchanals. The cornu was an ancient Roman musical instrument used in the ancient Roman military as a signaling instrument. It was used to give signals to the entire unit.

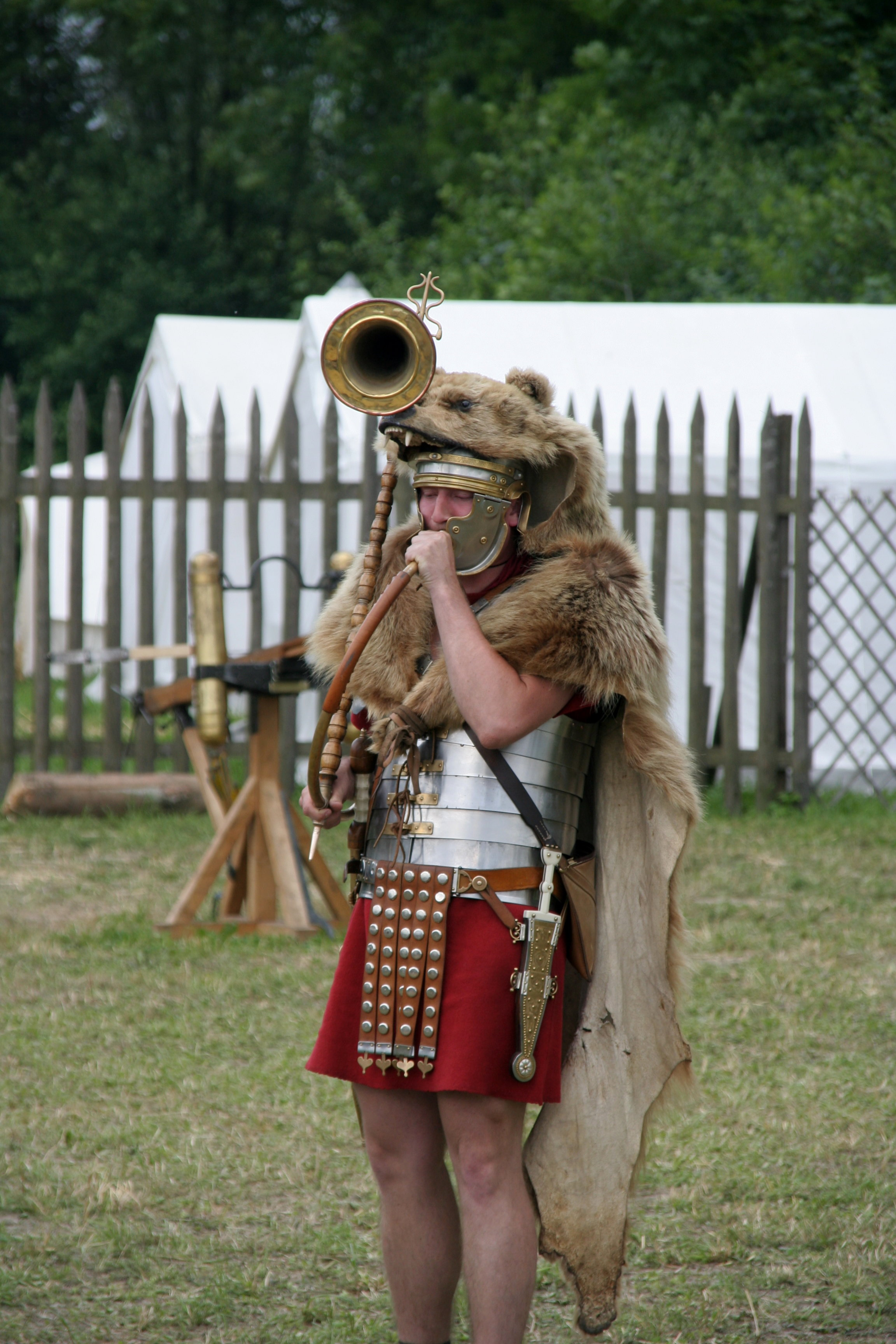
Reenactor blowing a cornu

The military writer Vegetius described the use of horns to give signals:

The music of the legion consists of trumpets, cornets and buccinae. The trumpet sounds the charge and the retreat. The cornets are used only to regulate the motions of the colors; the trumpets serve when the soldiers are ordered out to any work without the colors; but in time of action, the trumpets and cornets sound together. The classicum, which is a particular sound of the buccina or horn, is appropriated to the commander-in-chief and is used in the presence of the general, or at the execution of a soldier, as a mark of its being done by his authority. The ordinary guards and outposts are always mounted and relieved by the sound of trumpet, which also directs the motions of the soldiers on working parties and on field days. The cornets sound whenever the colors are to be struck or planted. These rules must be punctually observed in all exercises and reviews so that the soldiers may be ready to obey them in action without hesitation according to the general's orders either to charge or halt, to pursue the enemy or to retire. For reason will convince us that what is necessary to be performed in the heat of action should constantly be practiced in the leisure of peace.

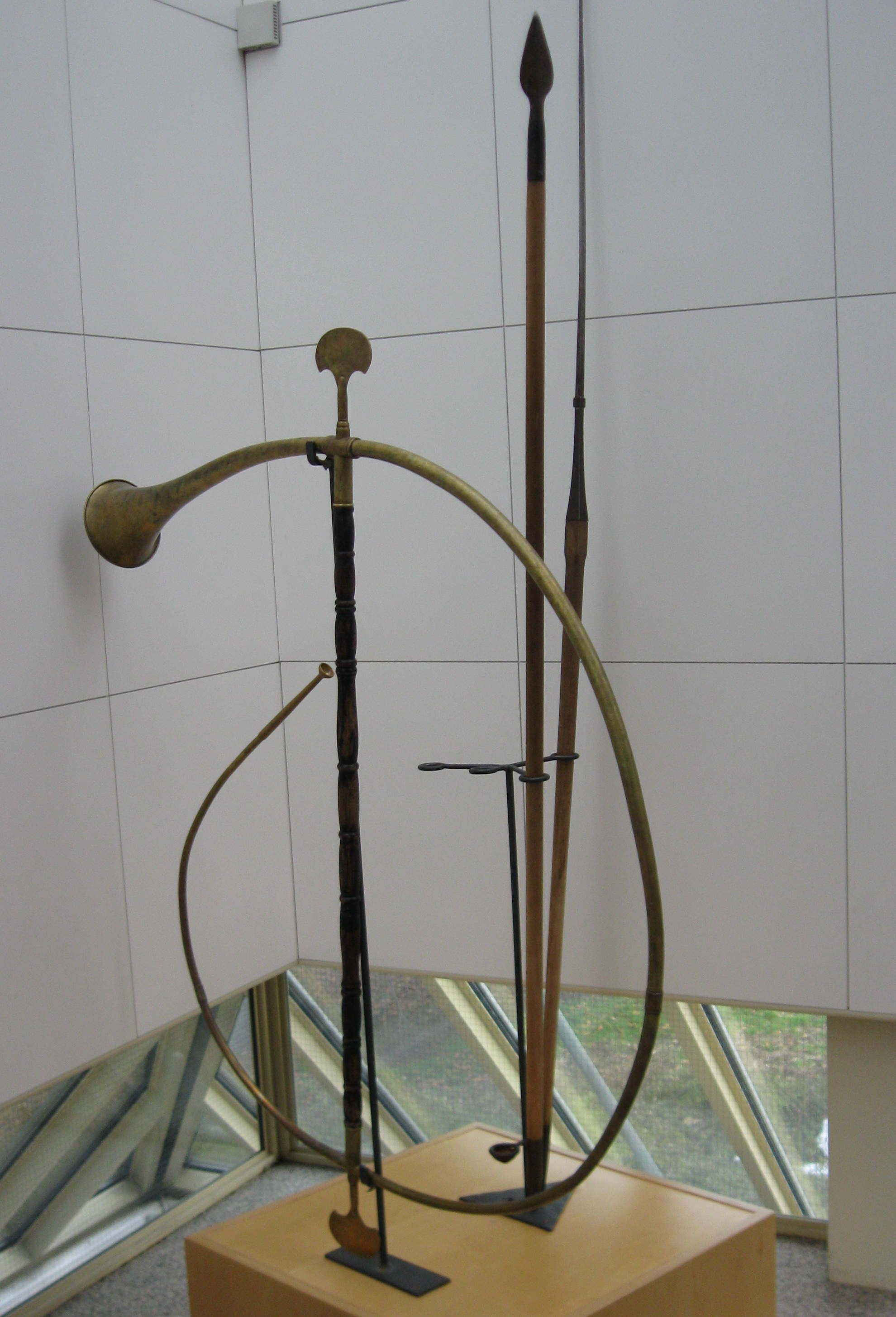
Cornu from the Roman Museum in Aalen, Germany

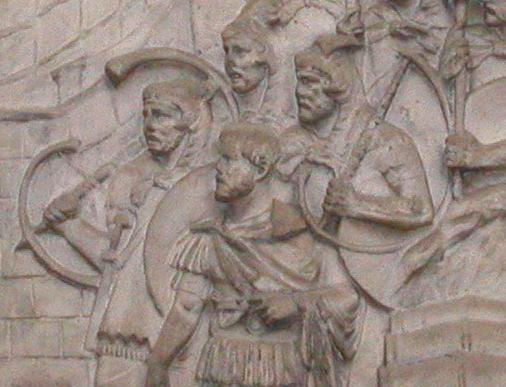
Cornicen on Trajan's Column

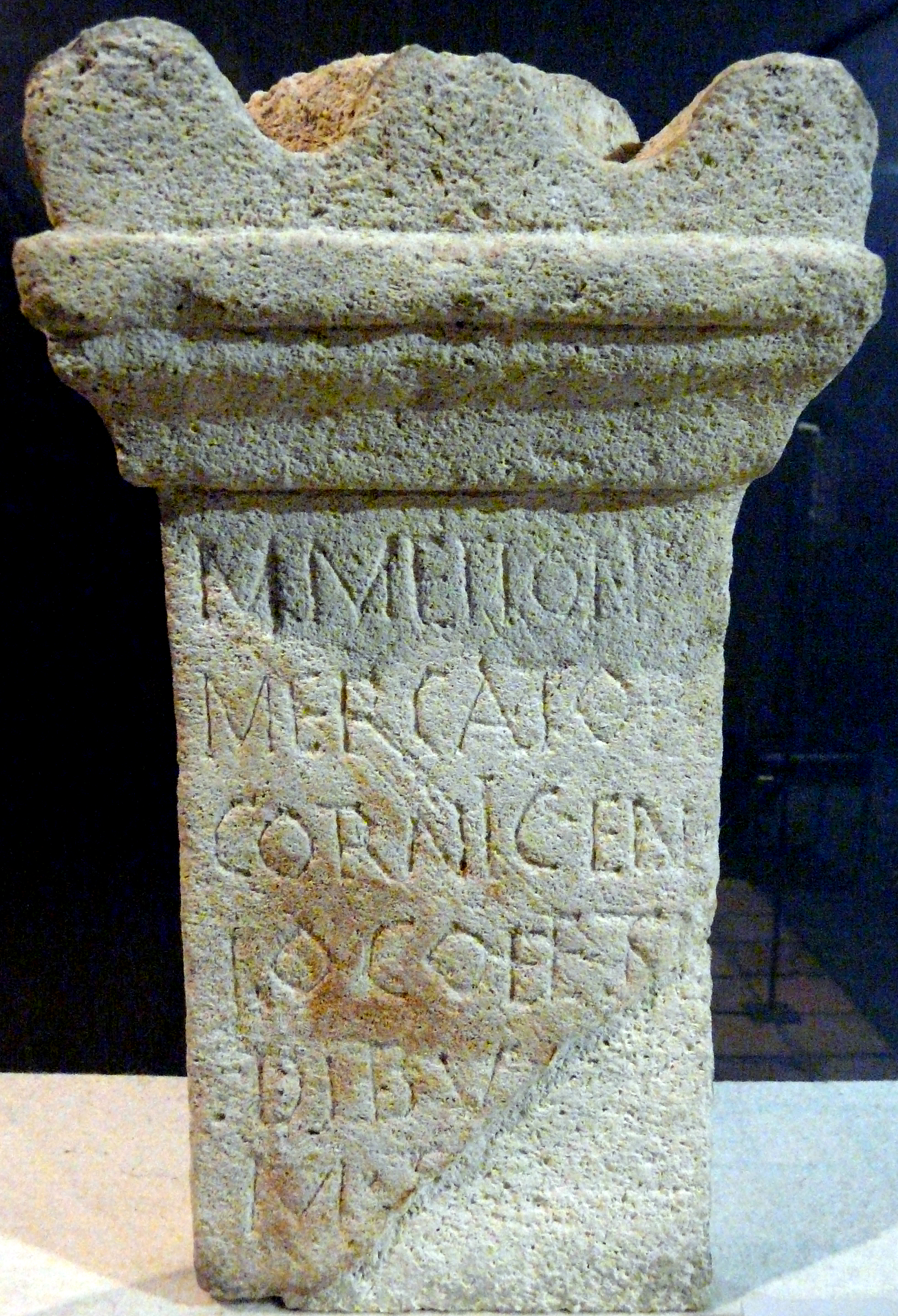
Tombstone of a cornicen from Novaesium

== Construction and shape ==
The cornu was originally made from an animal horn and later made from bronze. It was carried around the wearer's neck using a cord. The instrument was curved into spiral shape. 0.5 millimeter thick metal sheets which were likely made from bronze were used to make the spiral shape. The metal edges would have overlapped each other at the longest sides and were fixed through soldering. Sharp tools or stones would have been used to remove the excesses of the soldering alloys. The spiral was broken up into sectors connected by brass rings which were soldered onto the tubes. Iron curved cores would be used to work wooden pieces around 40 centimeters long to create the curved parts of each tubes. It had a copper and tin bell at the end and it was sometimes made with a cross-brace. These ends were connected by a transverse rod that may have been made of wood and was held in place by iron nails. Holes would have been placed at the ends of these rods and would have been used to secure the nails to the bars. The bell was made from a flat sheet of folded metal.

The cornu would be used by a musician known as a cornicen. This musician would play it by holding it vertically and pointing it forward. The tubing would pass around the player's left shoulder. It would be played by holding the cornu with the player's left hand while the right hand pressed the mouthpiece against the lips, the breath and force of the player determining the sound of the instrument.

== Tuba curva ==
The cornu was revived as the "tuba curva" during the French Revolution, along with the buccina. Both were first used in music that François Joseph Gossec composed for the translation of the remains of Voltaire to the Panthéon, on 11 July 1791.

== See also ==
- Music of ancient Rome
- Sousaphone
