= Roman tuba =

Ancient Roman military signal trumpet

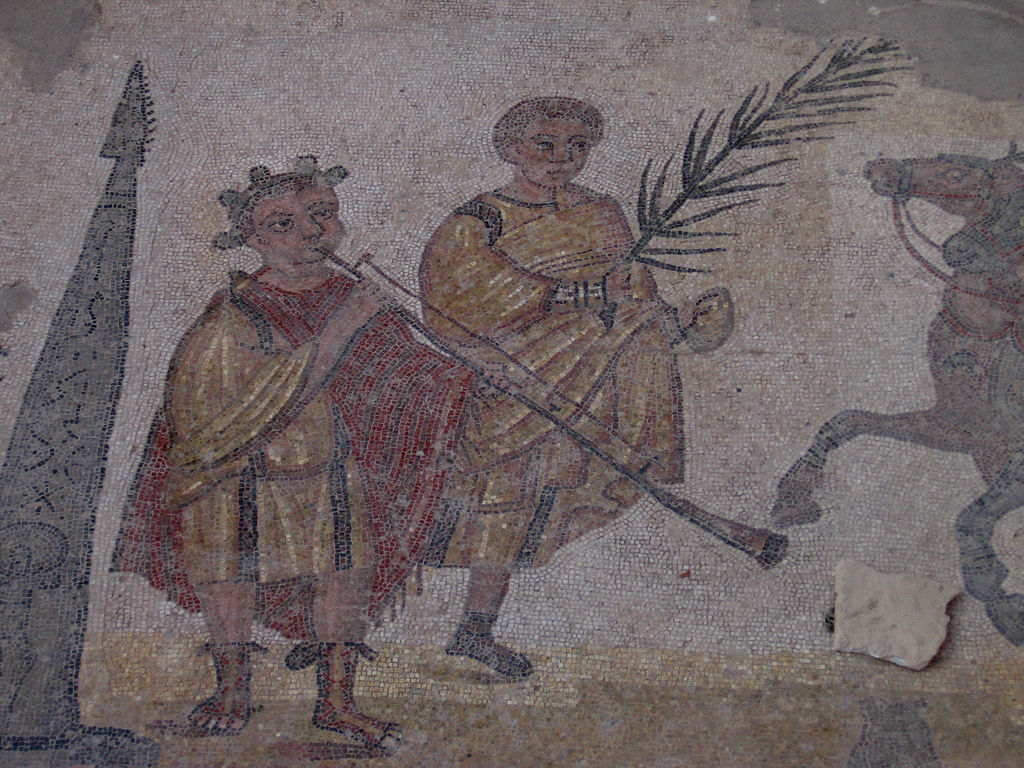
Mosaic showing the Roman tuba and its size in relation to its player, circa 4th century A.D. Villa Romana del Casale, Piazza Armerina, Sicily, Italy

The Roman tuba (plural: tubae), or trumpet was a military signal instrument used by the ancient Roman military and in religious rituals. They would signal troop movements such as retreating, attacking, or charging, as well as when guards should mount, sleep, or change posts. Thirty-six or thirty-eight tubicines (tuba players; singular tubicen) were assigned to each Roman legion. The tuba would be blown twice each spring in military, governmental, or religious functions. This ceremony was known as the tubilustrium. It was also used in ancient Roman triumphs. It was considered a symbol of war and battle. The instrument was used by the Etruscans in their funerary rituals. It continued to be used in ancient Roman funerary practices.

Roman tubae were usually straight cylindrical instruments with a bell at the end. They were typically made of metals such as silver, bronze, or lead and measured around 4.33 ft or 1.31 meters. Their players, known as the tubicines or tubatores were well-respected in Roman society. The tuba was only capable of producing rhythmic sounds on one or two pitches. Its noise was often described as terrible, raucous, or hoarse. Ancient writers describe the tuba as invoking fear and terror in those who heard it.

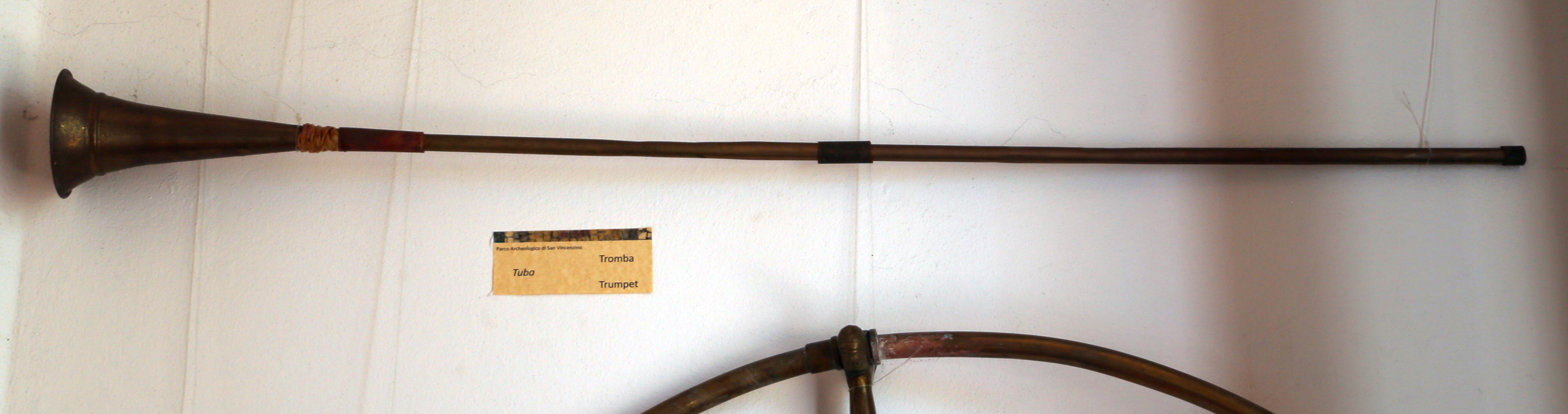
Roman tuba found in archaeological site of Roman Villa di San Vincenzino, Italy

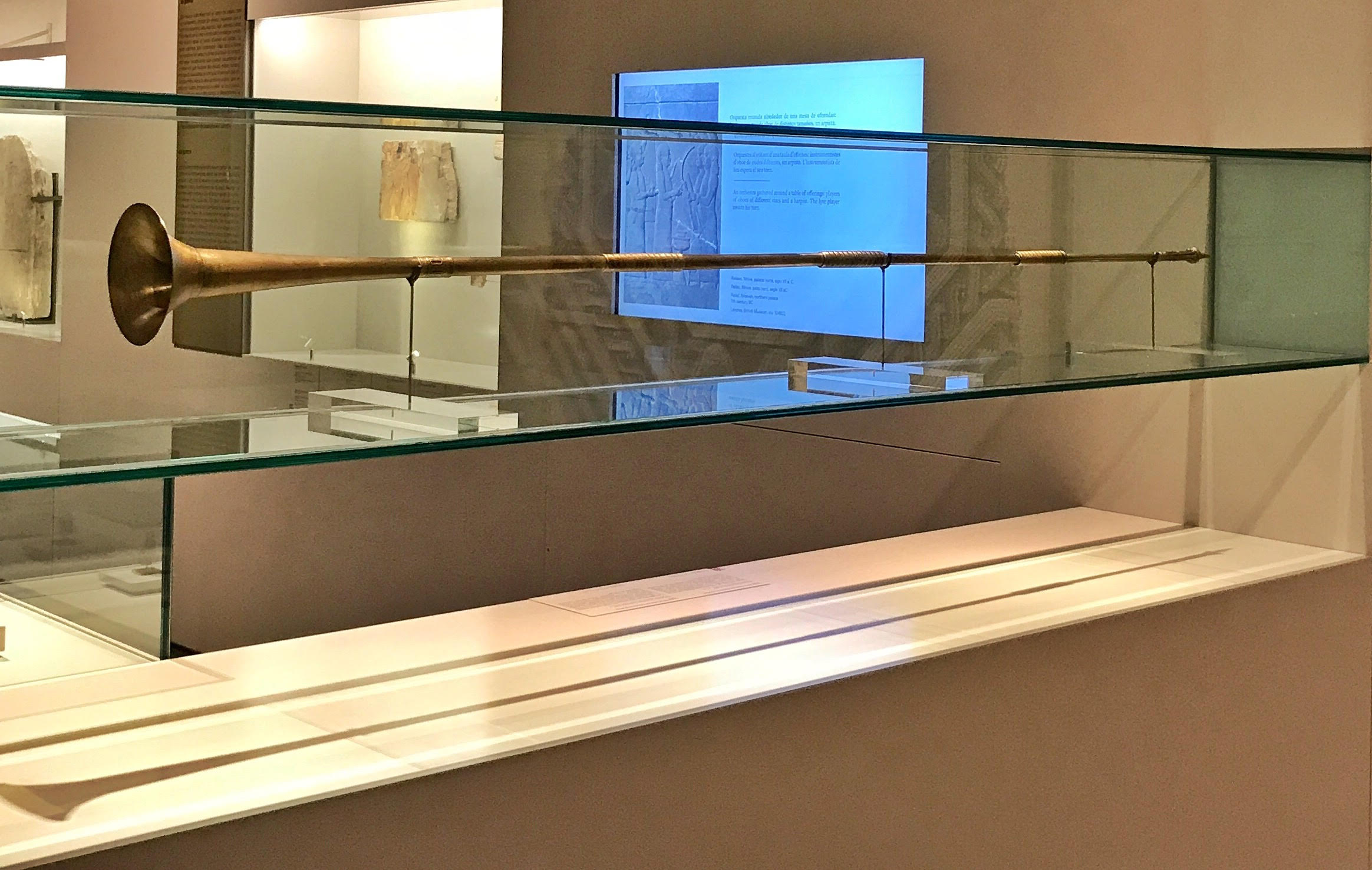
Reconstructed Roman tuba

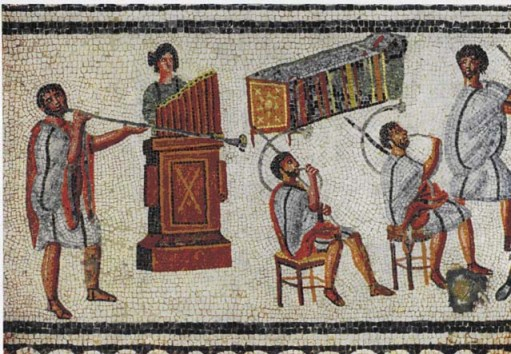
Musicians playing a Roman tuba, a water organ (hydraulis), and a pair of cornua, detail from the Zliten mosaic, 2nd century AD

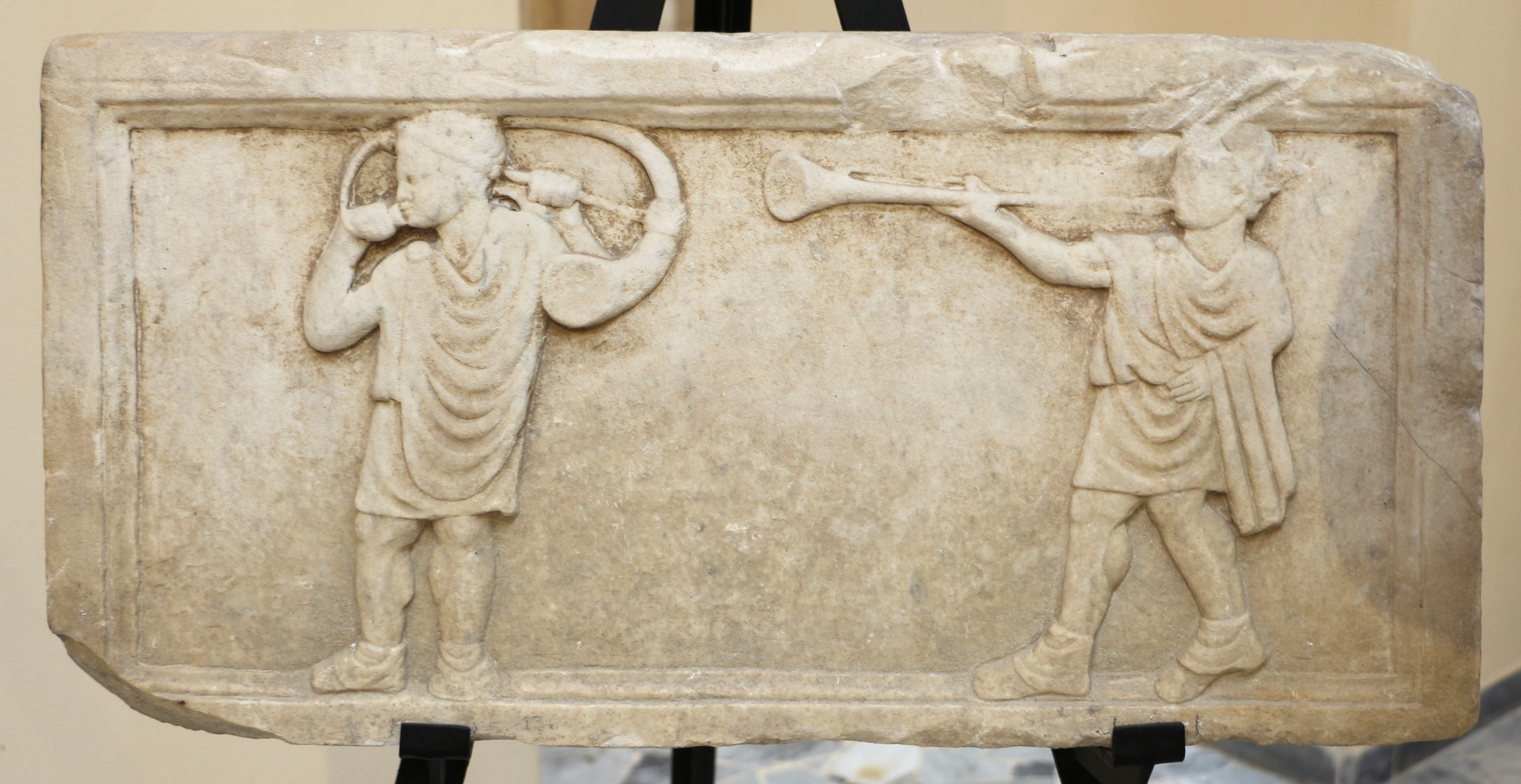
Roman cornu (left) and tuba (right) in a relief from the Museo Ostiense, Ostia Antica, Italy
