= Buisine =

Type of long medieval trumpet

Buisine or Añafil
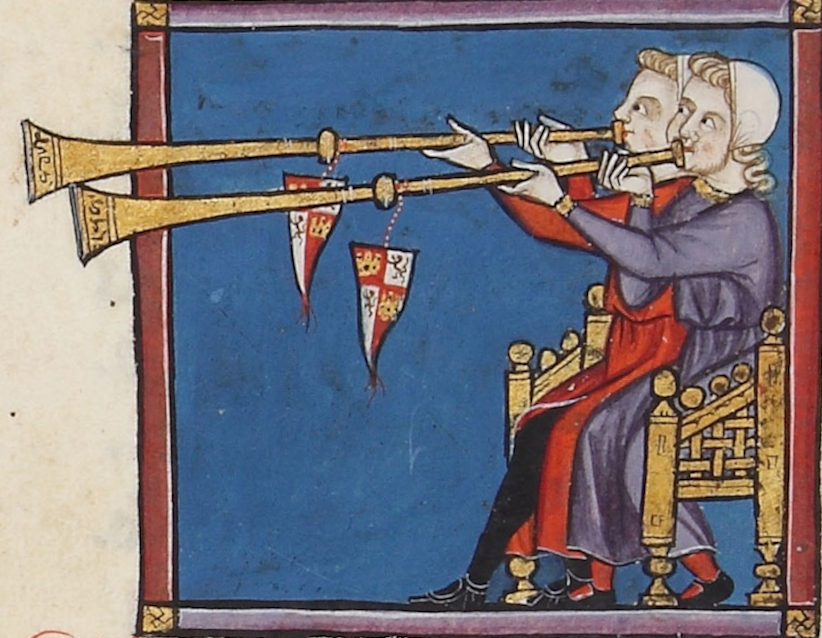
- Spanish trumpeters play the buisine or añafil. Illustration from the Cantigas de Santa Maria.

Brass instrument
- Classification: Brass
- Hornbostel–Sachs classification: 423.121 (Natural trumpets – There are no means of changing the pitch apart from the player's lips; end-blown trumpets – The mouth-hole faces the axis of the trumpet.)
- Developed: Developed from the nafir in multiple importations to Europe. Arabs brought to Spain, and Crusaders from France and other Christian countries brought instruments home as war trophies.

Related instruments
- Clarion; Fanfare trumpet; Nafir; Natural trumpet

Sound sample
- Sound of the añafil

The buisine and the añafil were variations of a type of straight medieval trumpet usually made of metal, also called a herald's trumpet. While arguably the same instrument, the two names represent two separate traditions, in which a Persian-Arabic-Turkic instrument called the Nafir entered European culture in different places and times.

The term buisine (Old French; also, busine, buysine, buzine) descends from Buccina, a Roman military horn. The horn was mainly used for military and ceremonial purposes. When Europeans went to the crusades, the instrument was seen as a proper military target (in the same way a flag or pendant was), something to capture and bring home.

The term añafil descends from al-Nafir, the Persian-Arab Islamic trumpet which was used by Moorish armies in Spain, before the Crusades. By the Reconquista (722–1492) when residents of the future Spain retook the Iberian Peninsula, añafil was part of the nation's language. The image that is among Europe's earliest representation of the instrument came from this tradition, in the 13th century Spanish work, the Cantigas de Santa Maria.

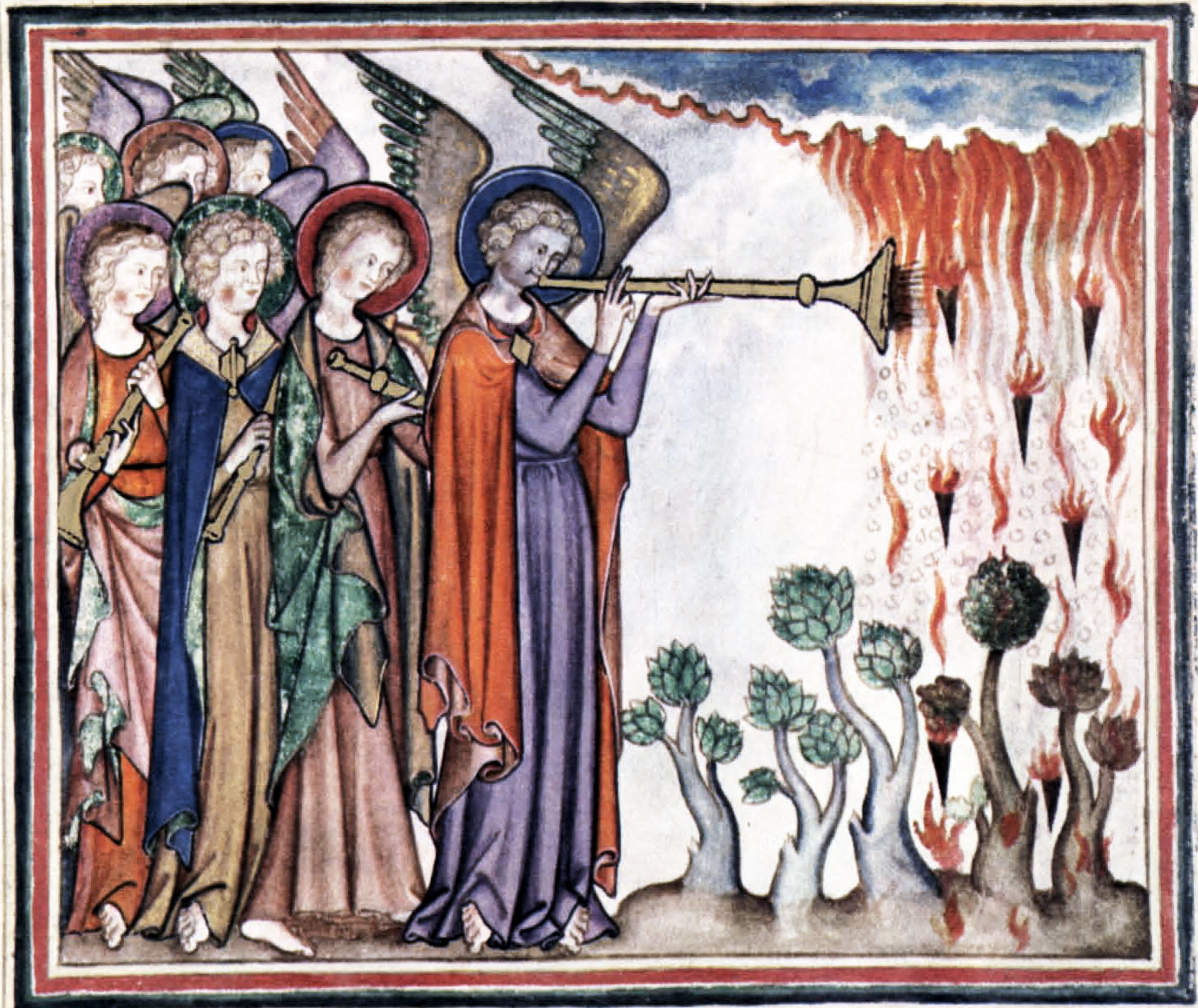
Cloisters Apocalypse miniature, circa 1330. An angel plays an añafil, and fire rains on the earth.

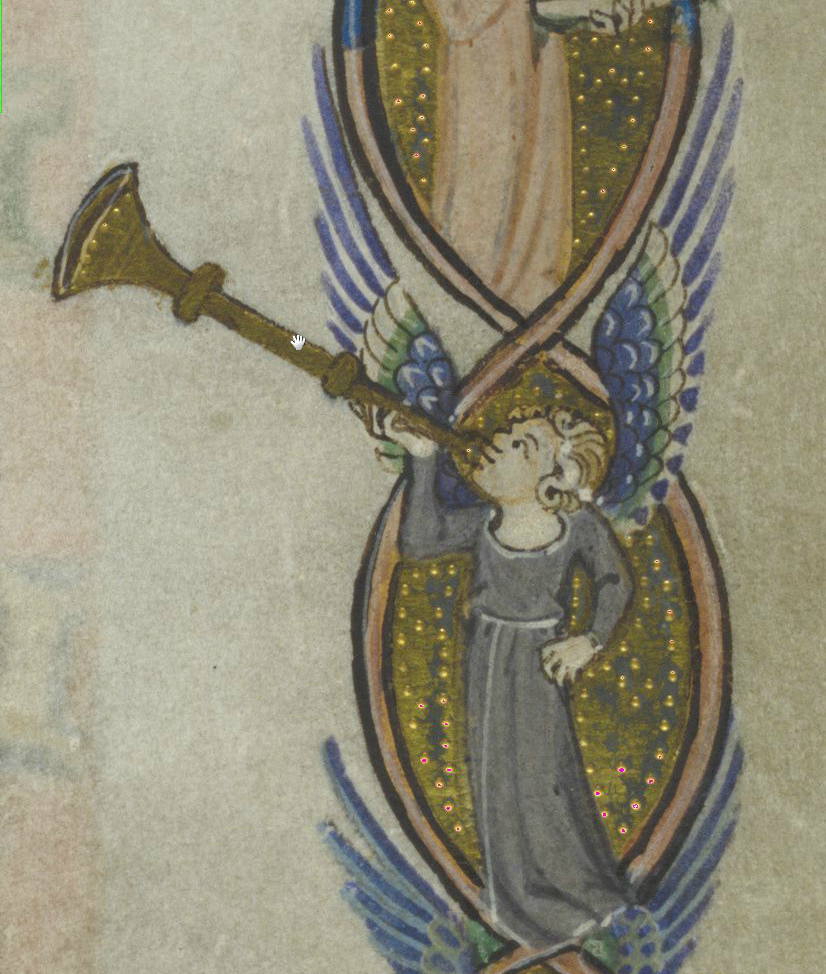
Angel from Petersboro Psalter playing a long trumpet or possibly a shawm. 1320 A.D.

The buisine—añafil is precursor of today's fanfare trumpet, it had a very long and slender body, usually one to two metres in length (some were reported to have been at least six feet in length) that tapered toward the end into a slightly flared bell. It is commonly seen in paintings being played by angels and often also bearing the banner of a nobleman. As the herald's trumpet was widely used in Fanfares. These instruments would serve as a sort of timekeeper to announce events and meetings. Their long, tubed shape would allow them to hang flags and banners, which made them popular for events and ceremonies.

The term buisine is first found in the c. 1100 Chanson de Roland, and it was probably a general term for horns and trumpets rather than referring to a specific instrument. Early trumpets were slightly curved, but the term was applied c. 1300 to straight trumpets imported from the Middle East during the Crusades.

The modern German word for trombone, Posaune, is a corruption of buisine by way of busaun.

== History ==
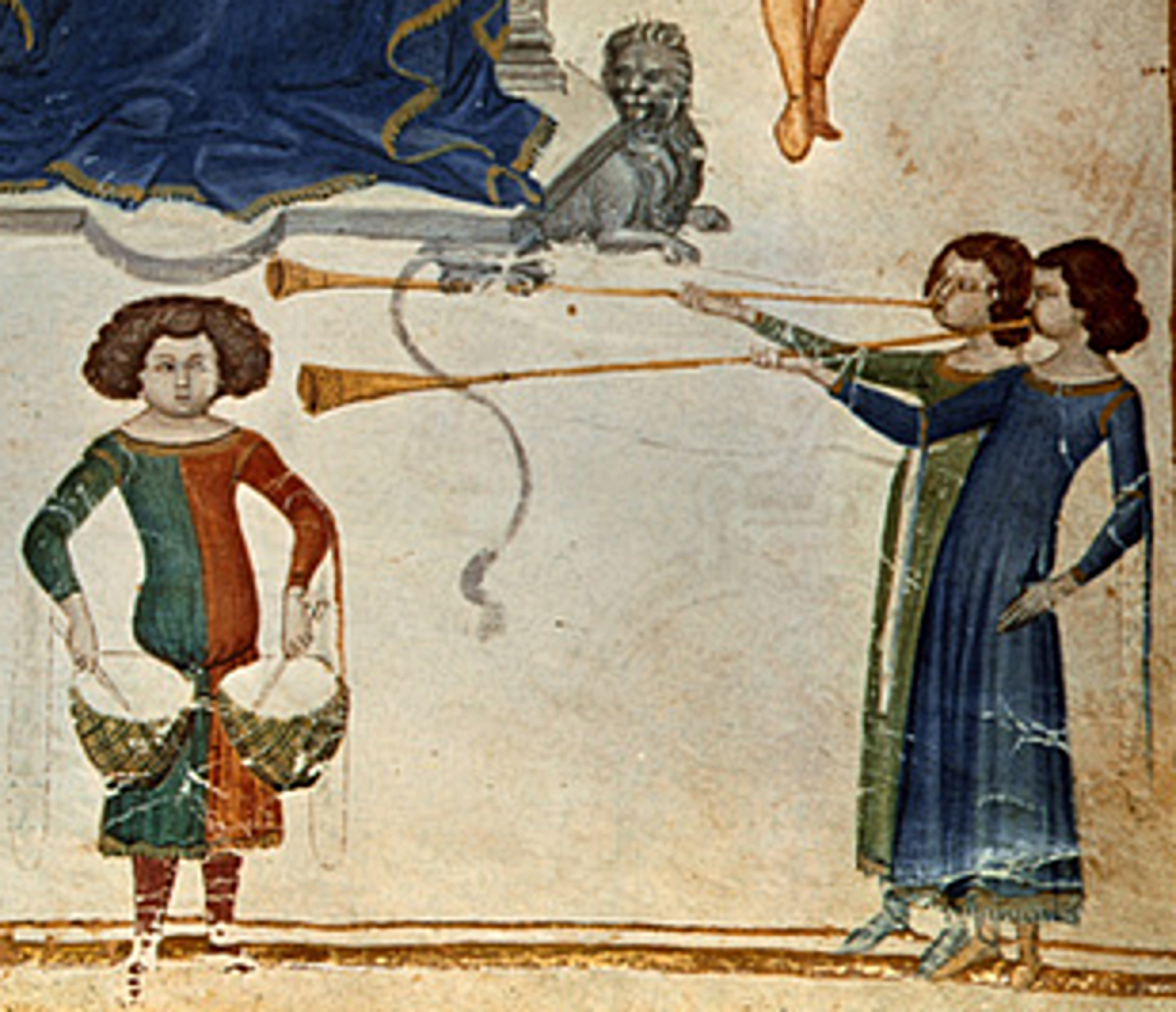
Buisine trumpets, drums, Italy, 14th century

There were multiple different instruments that were used in the Middle Ages that can be described as medieval trumpets. Historians believe that the advancement of trumpets came from a variety of people. The use of animal horns were used as instruments in Oriental and Roman cultures. Advanced craftsman used these concepts to design the first metal instruments.

The anafil was introduced to the Iberian Peninsula at the time of the Muslim conquest which created Al-Andalus, and maintained for centuries the name Moorish nafil, since the Andalusian Arabs used it to execute the sharp parts of the fanfares and military touches. Later, it was introduced to Europe by the Saracen armies and the Christian armies of the Crusades.

The buisine is referenced as the forerunner of all brass instruments. The brass instrument known as the busine first appeared in Southern Italy in the 11th century. It was introduced in two forms; one with a conical, curved tube called the Cornu, and one with a straight, cylindrical shape. A smaller version of the buisine, known as the clarion, was also popular during these times. The clarion plays in the same register as its counterparts, but plays in a higher pitch due to its smaller structure. The Roman cornu was popular in Europe and the Orient, while the buisine and clarion were mostly used in England and France.

From the late Middle Ages, the anafil begins to lose its character as a war instrument to become a messenger and instrument of protocol. As an instrument of heraldry it took on courtly character in European courts. Progressively, the long tube of the anafil began to curve, and in the Renaissance it continues to curve in the shape of an "S" and twist into loops. By the early 1400s it had shifted into a double coiled S-shape, in one form being called the clarion. It evolved until it merged with the baroque trumpet, and was gradually assimilated by the new trumpets and bagpipes. In the 19th century this metal wind instrument incorporates keys and pistons that give it the appearance and functionality of today's metal instruments.

At present it is a unique and characteristic instrument of the processions of the Semana Santa de Cabra (Córdoba), where it is called abejorro (bumblebee). Its modern equivalent is the nafīr, which in the Maghrib is sounded from the minarets in the month of Ramadan.

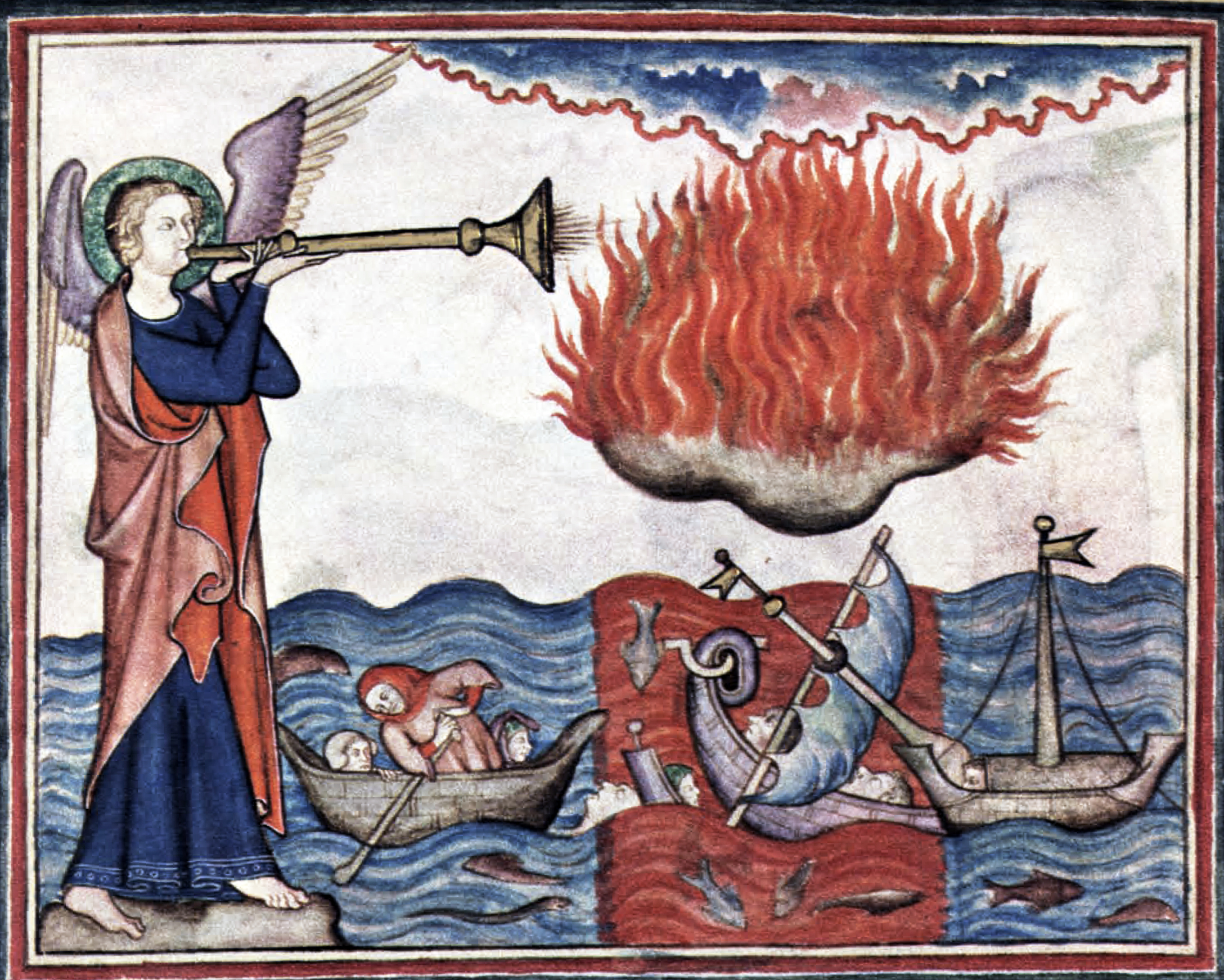
Cloisters Apocalypse, an angel sounds an añafil (the 2nd trumpet) and fire rains on the sea.

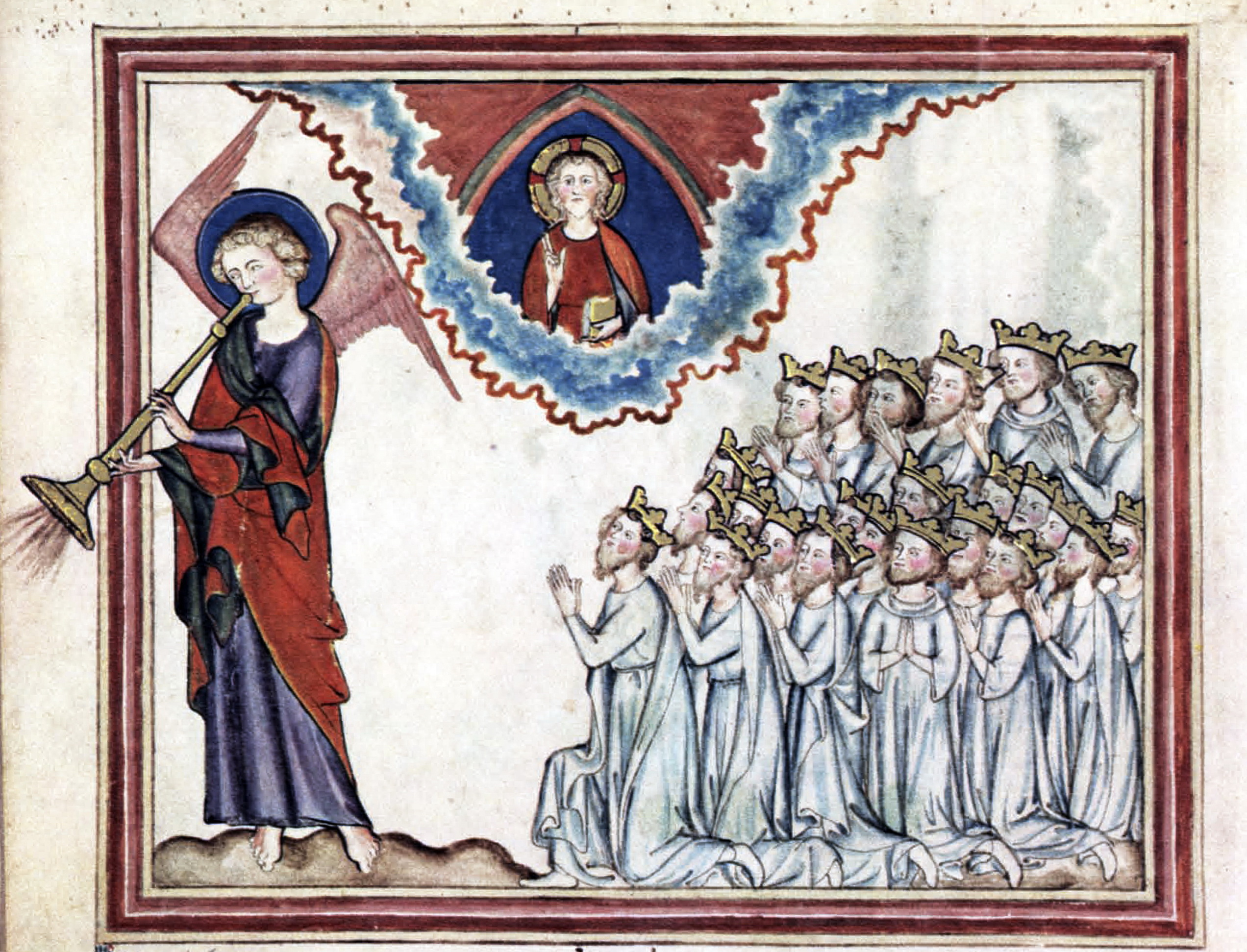
An angel plays the 7th trumpet, an añafil, in adoration of God

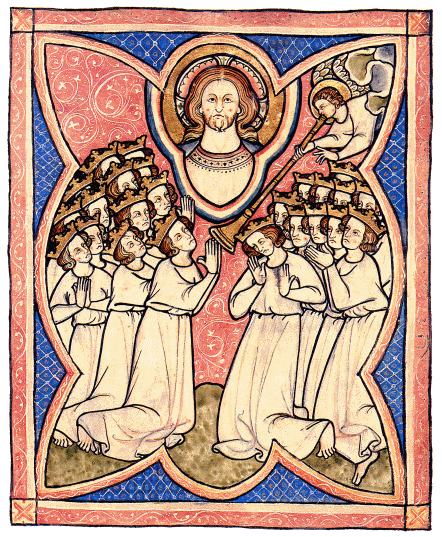
The Seventh Trumpet (añafil), adoration in Heaven, in a miniature preserved in the Trinity College Library, Dublin, late 13th century.

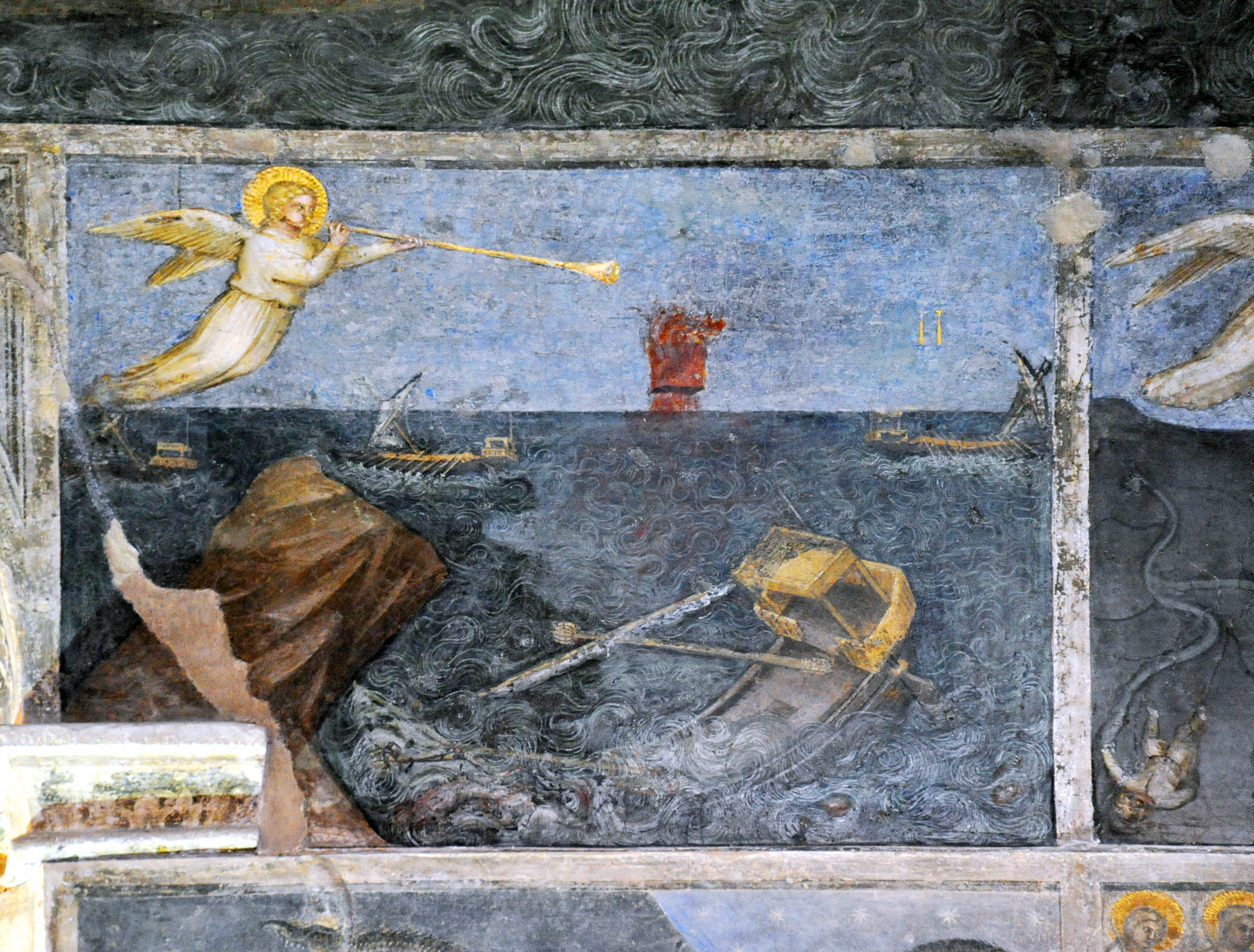
Fresco in the Baptistery of the Cathedral of Padua, 14th century by Giusto de' Menabuoi (Apocalypse). Angel sounding the second trumpet in an apocalypse-themed painting, using a buisine.

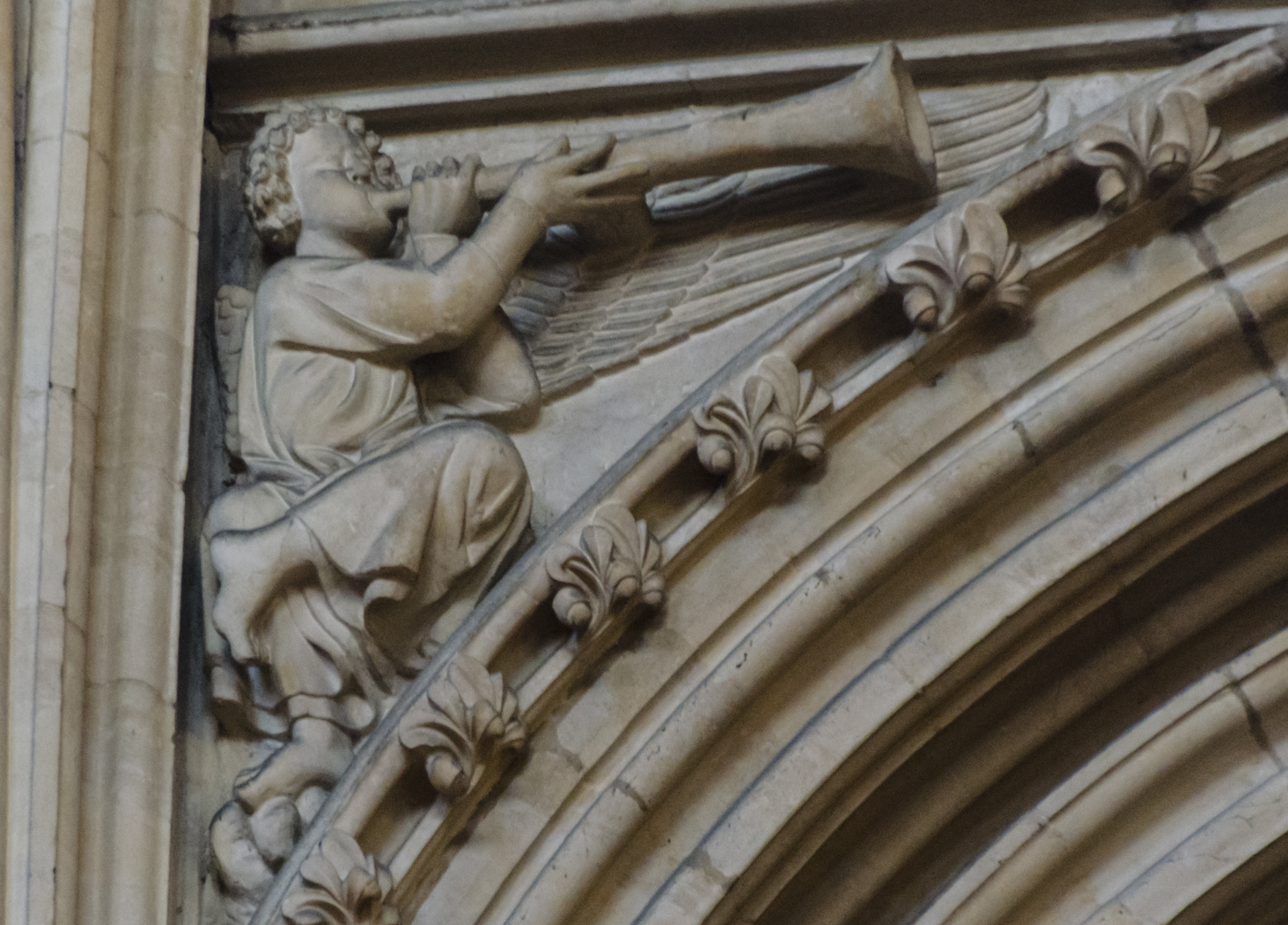
Trumpet-playing member of the Angel Choir at Lincoln Cathedral dates from the second half of the 13th century.

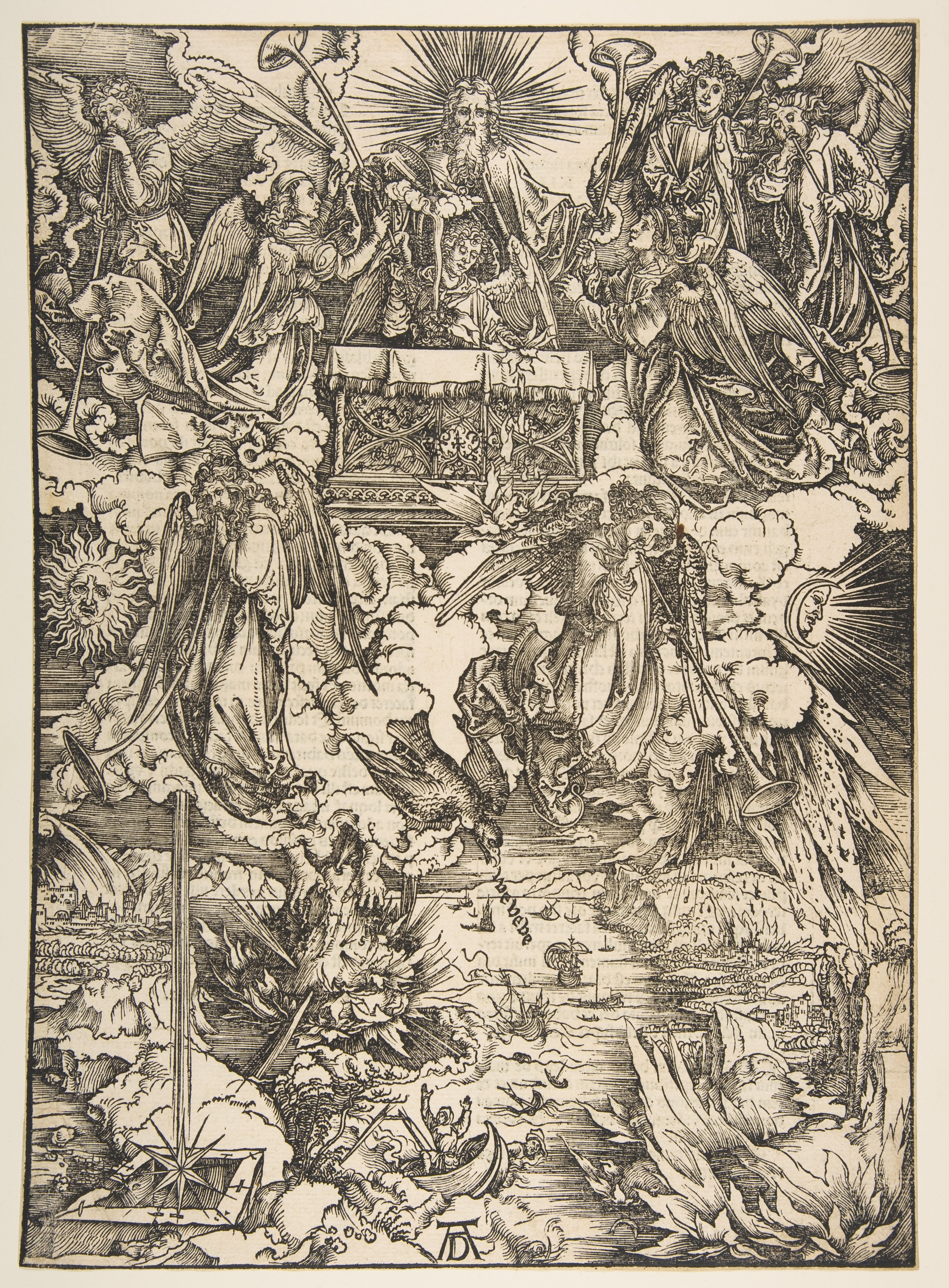
The Seven Angels with the Trumpets, from The Apocalypse, Latin Edition, 1511

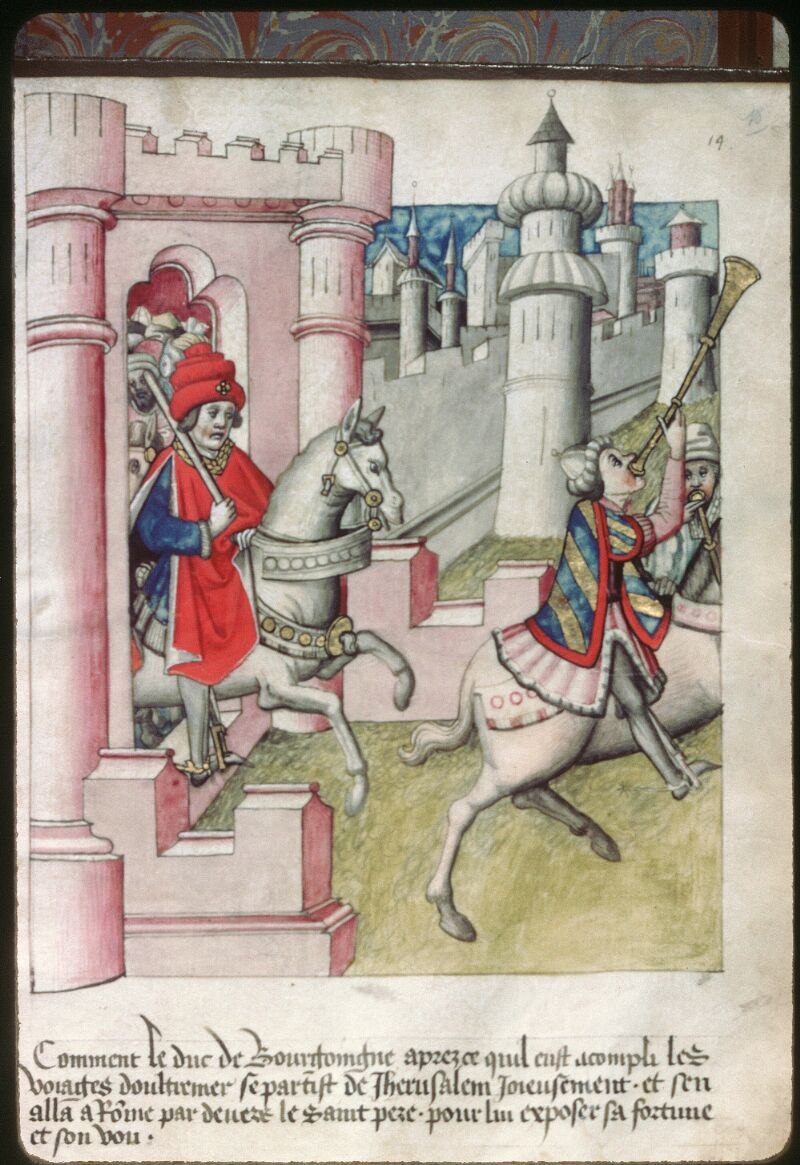
Buisine player and religious figure, Manuscript of Saint-Esprit. 1450-1460 A.D.

== Sound ==
Unlike modern day trumpets, the buisine does not have piston or rotary valves to change pitches chromatically. This limited players to only set notes given within a specific harmonic series. The buisine makes a loud, buzzing sound which makes them so popular for events and ceremonies. The buisine, unlike coiled trumpets, sends vibration through the tube uninterrupted. This results in a louder sound as well as the sound appearing to come from a distance. The sound of buisine can be compared to that of a military bugle. The instrument plays in a lower register. The sound can be described as powerful, heroic, and substantial. The notes in this register come off as rounded and full. This register can go as low as C4. These notes come off as distinct, strong, and eerie. They are often used to help depict battle stories. The powerful, distinct notes in this register make this instrument useful for events and ceremonies. They are able to attract attention and employ feelings of royalty and power.

== Possible descendants ==
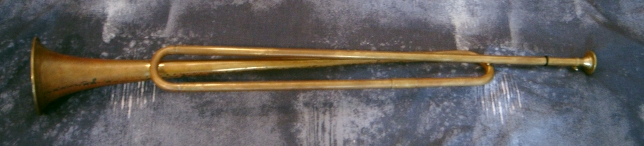
Slide trumpet, a predecessor of the trombone

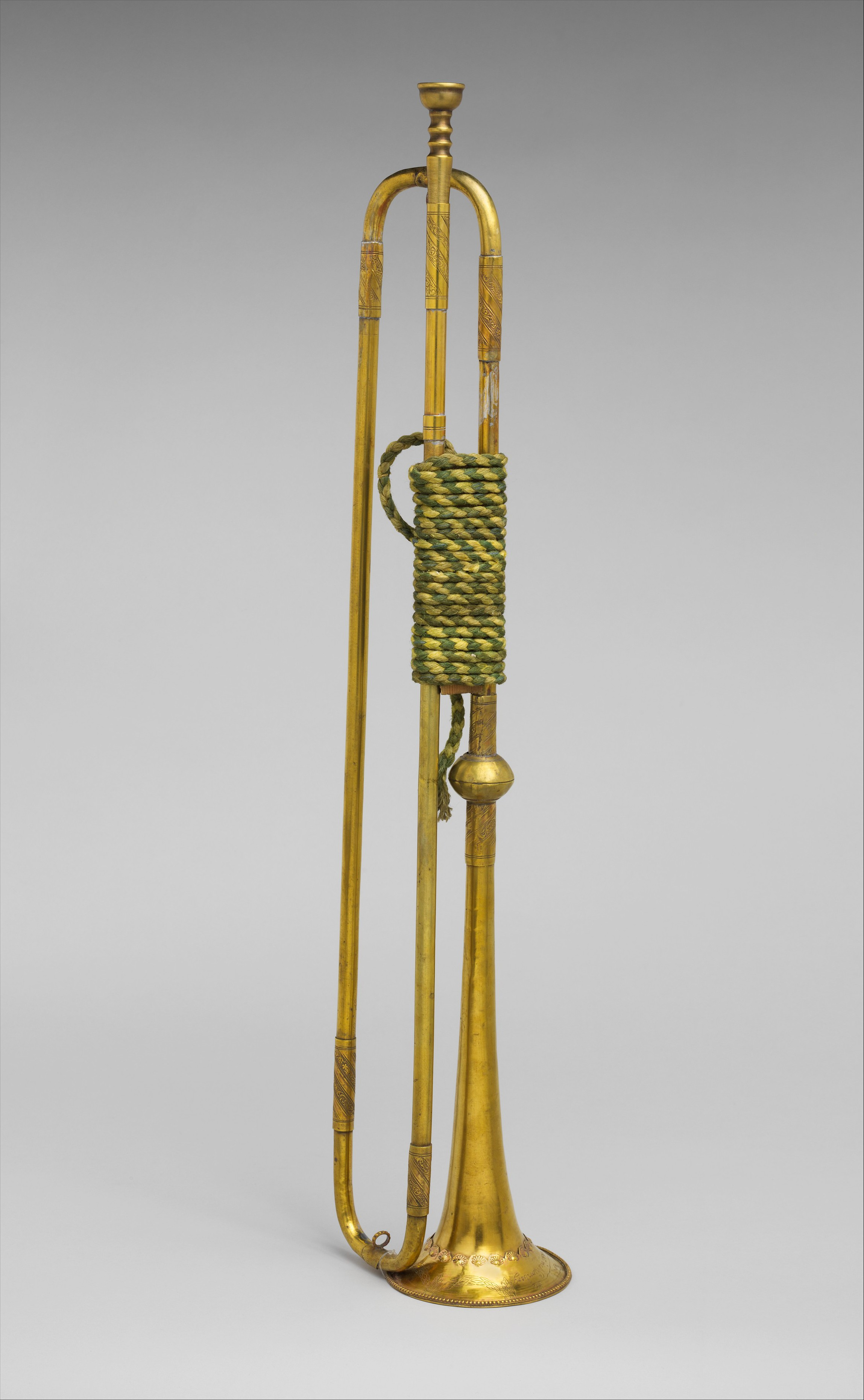
Baroque trumpet made by Johann Wilhelm Haas (German, Nuremberg 1649–1723), late 17th century. The next stage of the long natural trumpets was to bend them to be more compact.

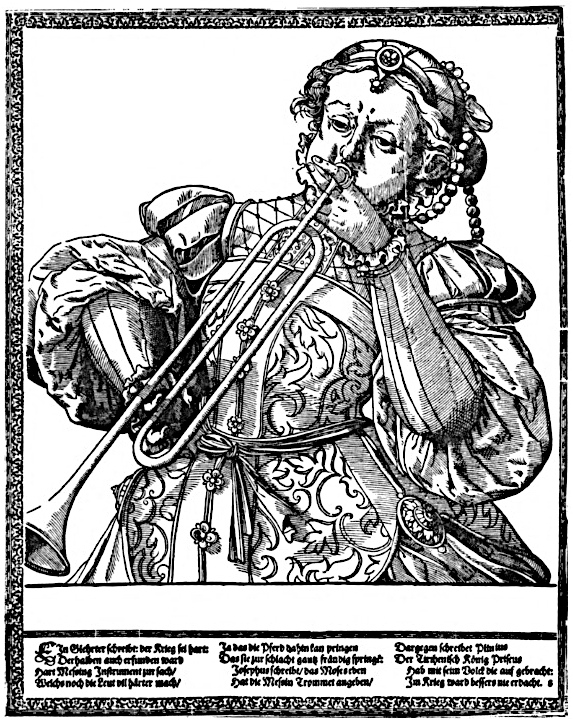
Clarion, 16th century.
