= Clarion (instrument) =

Trumpet used in the Middle Ages and Renaissance

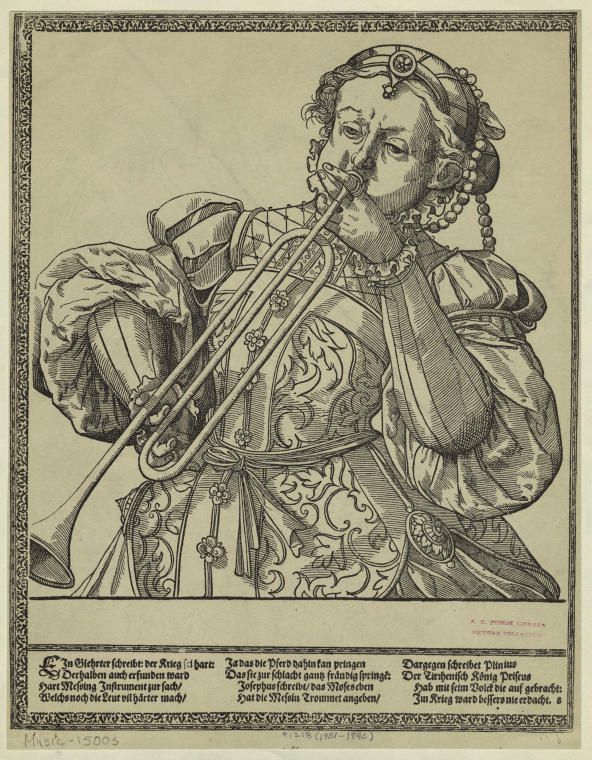
- Woman playing a clareta or clarion, from a woodcut by Tobias Stimmer, c. 1575. Possibly a slide trumpet or trombone.

Brass instrument
- Other names: clairon, clarin trumpet, clarino, chiarina
- Classification: Brass
- Hornbostel–Sachs classification: 423.121 (Natural trumpets – There are no means of changing the pitch apart from the player's lips; end-blown trumpets – The mouth-hole faces the axis of the trumpet. Some may have been (423.22) slide trumpets, in an attempt to gain more notes.)
- Developed: Developed from the buisine or by experimenting with the idea of a metal tubular instrument with bends to shorten length

Related instruments
- Bugle; Buisine; Fanfare trumpet; Natural trumpet; Nafir; Piccolo trumpet; Sackbut; Slide trumpet

Sound sample
- Courtly, high, brass sound; clarion-like Sound of the lower pitched Añafil; braying of a donkey

Clarion is a name for a high-pitched trumpet used in the Middle Ages and the Renaissance. It is also a name for a 4' organ reed stop that produces a high-pitched or clarion-like sound on a pipe organ in the clarion trumpet's range of notes.

The word clarion has changed meanings over centuries and across languages. Today, in modern French clairon refers to the bugle, while in Italy chiarina refers to modern trumpets of historic design, made from bent tubing and without valves, similar to the natural trumpet. Resembling these instruments is the modern fanfare trumpet, like the chiarina or natural trumpet, but with the option of using valves.

Clarion became a musical term to refer the upper register of the standard trumpet. However, a clarin trumpet did exist with a narrower bore than the standard trumpet and a "broad, flat mouthpiece," designed to "play the high partials."

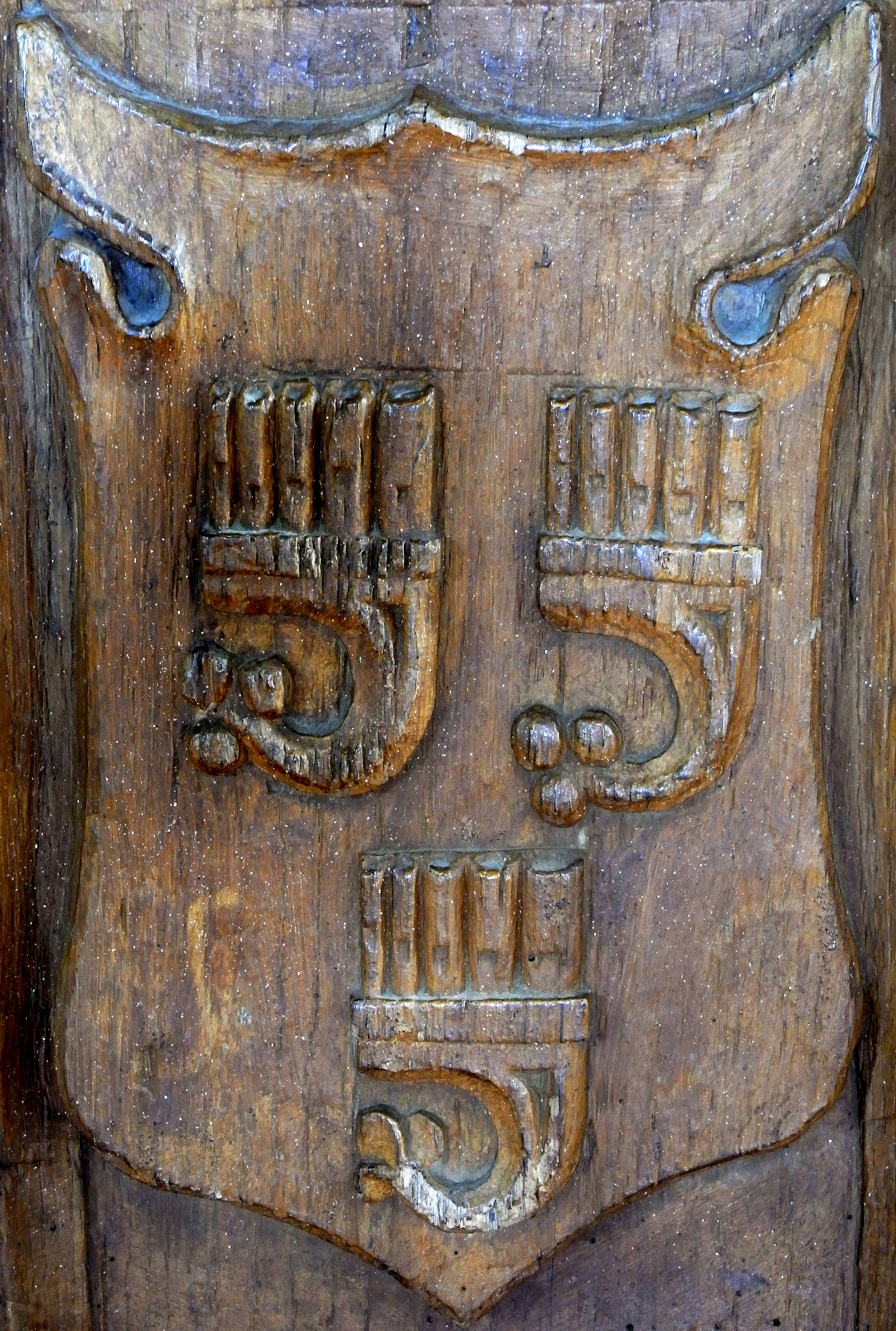
Clarion as heraldic device depicted in the coat of arms of Grenville, a mid-16th century carving which clearly shows the labium openings in the pipes of a pipe organ. Bench end in Sutcombe Church, Devon

In war the trumpet historically had a harsh sound, often described as, "like the braying of an ass." As technology improved the ability of trumpets to take pressure and reach more notes and higher notes, that higher-pitched sound became the focus of the term clarion. By the 14th century, it was described as high-pitched, shrill, or clear sounding.

In general (and not all early writers agreed) the clarion was a shorter trumpet with narrower bore. For example, a 1606 author named Nicot wrote that while the term clarion had once referred to a group of high pitched trumpets with a narrower bore, by his day it was the higher pitches in a sound range that any trumpet should be able to play.

The narrowing of the bore and the manufacturers' control of how gradually it widened changed the tone of new instruments. Rather than braying, the trumpets took on the sound of courts, sounding much like the modern fanfare trumpet. During the development process, longer "shrill" trumpets such as the añafil or buisine trumpets were folded into more compact forms. By 1511, Virdung had published engravings of these folded instruments, one labeled "clareta", which became the clarion. Tonally, clarin or clarino also came to refer to melodic playing in the upper register of the trumpet "with a soft and melodious, singing tone"

By 1600 the term clarin came to be a musical term used by composers for "the highest trumpet part" in Germany and Spain and was limited to German and Spanish composers from the 16th–19th centuries. Clarino was used by Italians, but not for trumpets.

== Trumpet history ==
After the fall of Rome, when much of Europe was separated from the remaining Eastern Roman Empire, both straight and curved tubular-sheet-metal trumpets disappeared, and curved horns from natural materials like cowhorn and wood were Europe's trumpet.

The straight sheet-metal tubular-trumpet persisted in the Middle East and Central Asia as the nafir and karnay, and during the Reconquista and Crusades, Europeans began to build them again, having seen these instruments in their wars. The first made were the añafil in Spain and buisine in France and elsewhere. Then Europeans took a step that had not been part of trumpet making since the Roman (buccina and cornu); they figured out how to bend tubes without ruining them and by the 1400s were experimenting with new instruments.

Whole lines of brass instruments were created, including initial examples like the clarion, the natural trumpet, slide trumpet, and sackbut. These bent-tube variations shrunk the long tubes into a manageable size and controlled the way the instruments sounded.

Francis Galpin theorized that straight trumpets, buisines, of different lengths became different instruments. Shorter instruments with narrower tubing became the clarions and field trumpets (the clarions being the narrower of the two). Longer, lower pitched trumpets became the trombone. Comparing the field trumpet and the clarion, Galpin said both were used in fanfare music, the broader tubed and longer field trumpet taking lower notes, the clarion the higher notes.

European experiments with bent-tube instruments in turn influenced Islamic musical instruments, resulting in the S-curved nafir or karnay and the Turkish boru.

== Etymology ==
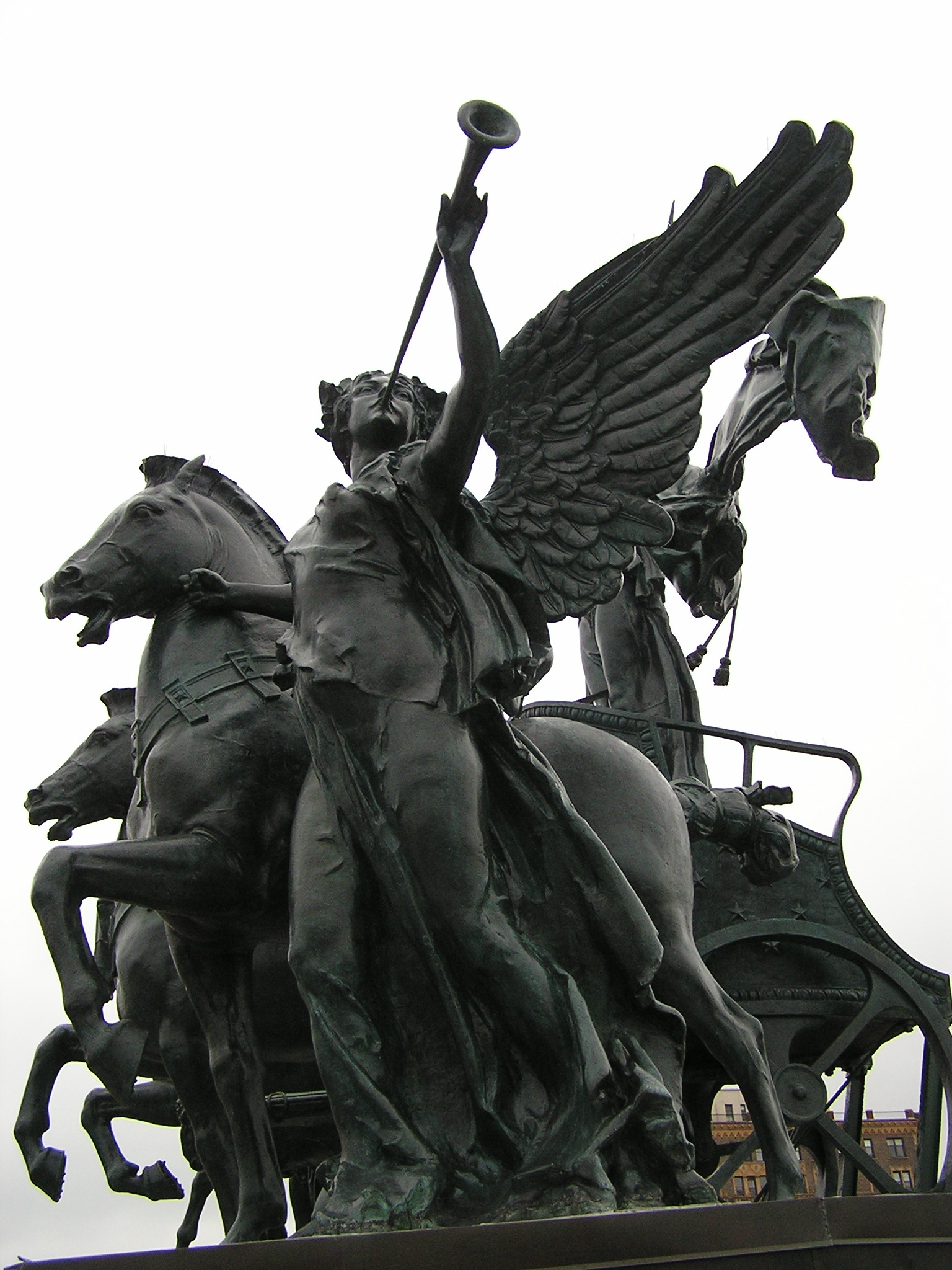
Straight trumpet, short enough to have clarion notes. High pitched trumpets are shorter instruments. In comparison to the busine, the trumpet pictured is shorter. The añafil (Spanish renaming of Arabic Nafir, also called buisine was between 4 and 7 feet long. Calling it "clairon," Nicot said the nafir at 4.25–5 ft long served as treble for the Moore's other trumpets, which sounded tenor and bass tones. Some of those trumpets such as the modern Moroccan nafir reach about 6 ft long, and the Tajikistani karnay can reach as long as 6 ft 10 (210 cm).

"Clarion" derives from three Latin words: the noun clario (trumpet), the adjective clarus (bright or clear), and the verb claro (to make clear). Throughout Europe, an eclectic set of variations on clarion came into use. The meaning of these variations was not standard. It is not clear whether they are meant to refer to an actual instrument or simply the high register of the trumpet.

- In France, the usage evolved into words like "clairin", "clarin", "clerain", "clerin", "clairon", "claroncel", and "claronchiel". Clairon become the most commonly used version.
- English variants were "claro", "clario", "clarone", "clarasius", "clarioune", "claryon" and "clarion". Early clarion use found in written work in English from 1325 AD.
- In Spain, the terminology became "clarín" and "clarón".
- Italians used "chiarina", "chiarino", and "claretto", and by 1600, they began to use "clarino" or "chlarino", which became a standard, albeit widely misunderstood, term.
- In Germany, the usage was "clareta", and by the middle of the 16th century, "clarin".

== Usage of the word ==
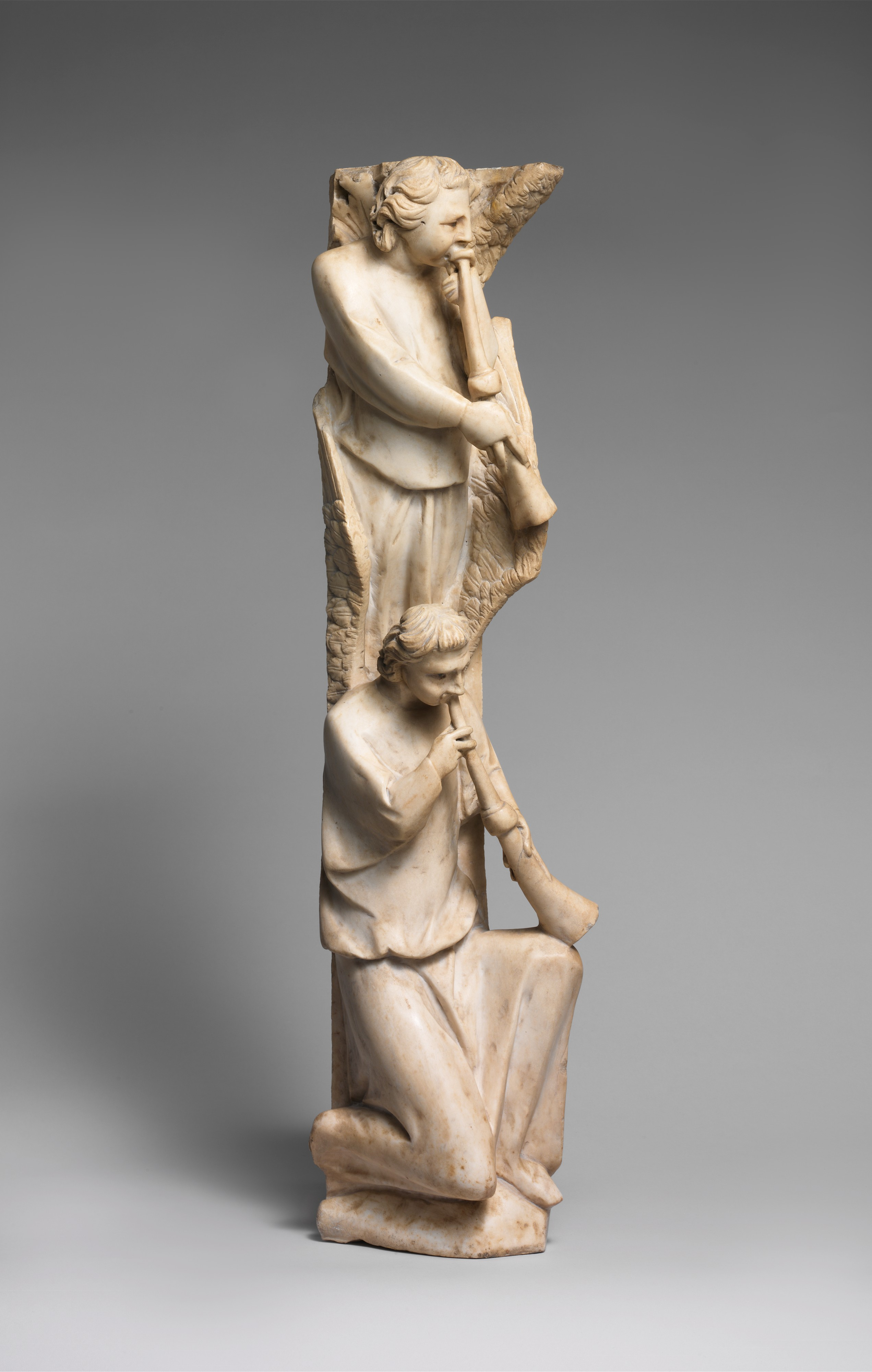
Angels sounding trumpets. With the exception of some early European instruments such as the Greek salpinx and Roman tuba, cornu and buccina, pre-13th century European trumpets were horns, shaped like oxen horns until encounters with Islamic armies' nafirs inspired creation of instruments such as the Spanish añafil and French buisine.

The various iterations of "clarion" occur alongside the idiomatic usage of "trumpet" in the literature and historical records of several countries. The presence of these terms in concert with each other throughout such passages gave rise to a consensus that there must be a clarion trumpet which is distinct in construction from a standard trumpet. In France, historical records include phrases like "à son de trompes et de clarons", for instance. In his French dictionary, Jean Nicot wrote that the clarion is used among the Moors and the Portuguese (who adopted the Moors' custom). Nicot defines the clarion as a treble instrument, which is paired with trumpets playing the tenor and bass. Nicot also specifies that the clarion was used by the Cavalry and Marines.

In "The Knight's Tale", Chaucer writes, "Pypes, trompes, nakers, clariounes, that in bataille blowen blody sounes", which adds to the notion that clarions must somehow be distinct from trumpets.

This idea was bolstered by artworks of the time, which show a variety of trumpets in different shapes and sizes. There are even records from trade guilds like the Goldsmith's Company of London which specify that a clarion is 70% lighter than a trumpet. However, there is no precise understanding of what any of these variations meant. The fundamental confusion is over whether or not they refer to an actual instrument or to a style of playing in the high register of the trumpet. Even the Spanish historian Sebastián de Covarrubias confused the meaning in his Tesoro de la lengua castellana o española, writing that the clarin was a "trumpetilla", a tiny trumpet capable of playing in the high register or that the term could simply refer to the high register of the trumpet.

=== Baroque ===
The confusion over the usage of these terms seemed to mainly dissipate in the Baroque era, when "clarino" (plural: "clarini"), and its variants, came to be specifically understood as the practice of playing the natural trumpet in its high register.

== Range of notes ==
See: Natural trumpet for history of expanded tonal range.

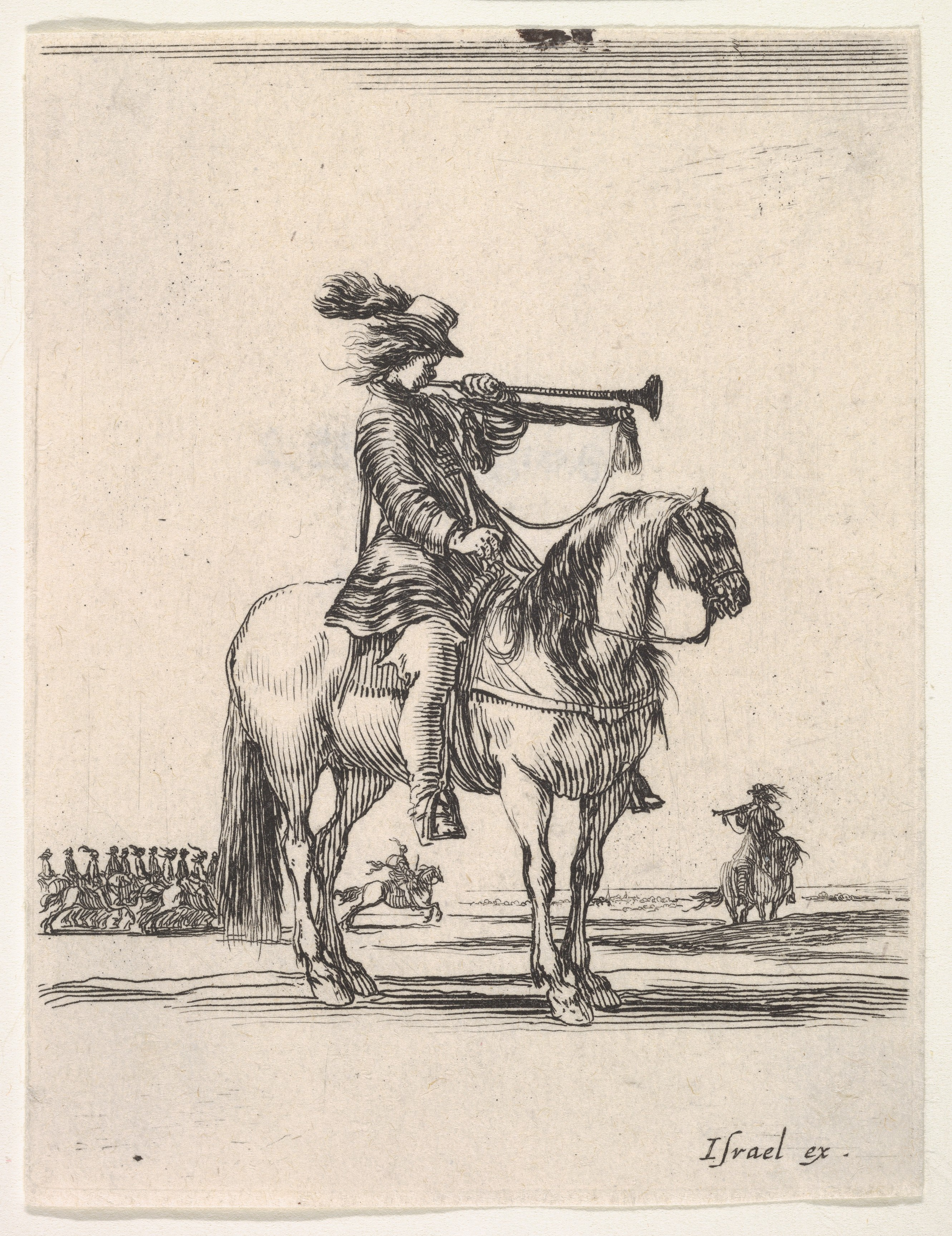
Cavalry use of short high-pitched trumpet, c. 1642–1645

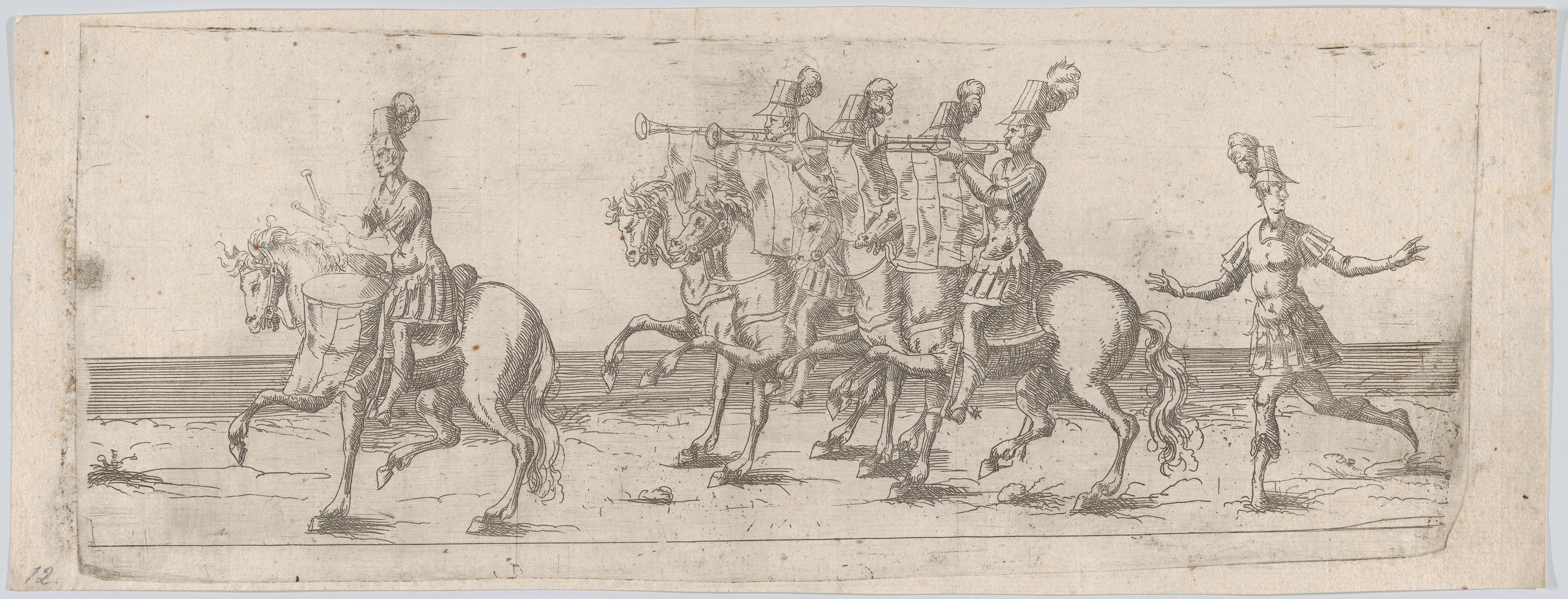
Military ensemble, with four straight trumpets and a bent-tube trumpet. The instruments are paired with horse-mounted timpani. 16th century.

Natural trumpets were originally war trumpets used to signal with a short repeating pattern. They were largely the same among European countries, consisting of two tones, a fifth apart. Calls were started with the lowest.

Before the modern naming systems were invented that allow us to describe a note with a letter, trumpeters assigned names to notes that their trumpets played. The names described a note's relationship to the other notes. Similar names were used in different countries, though the changed based on language.

The first named were the lowest, made by a long horn that could only play one note. When a second note was added, it was named in relationship to the original note, as the note that follows. Although military in use initially, trumpets were put into trumpet ensembles, with places in the ensemble based on the notes they played. The basic series by the 1600s was:

- 1 basso (also gross or grob). This was the oldest note, sometimes called boss or master. An early trumpet could play only one note well, possibly two. That good note was a low note, and formed the bottom of a series of notes.
- 2 Folgant, (also: vulgano or vorgano), the "note that follows", "follower", "attendant". A single note higher than the basso.
- 3 Alto e basso, altebasso, alterbass, or "up-and-down". 3 notes. Played harmony to the trumpet above it.
- 4 Sonata, quinta, principale. This became the modern standard trumpet, with a wide range of low and high notes. In this era it had between four and six notes and created a melody.
- 5 Clarin, claretta, claron, clarion. High ranging part, flourishes and some melody parts above the quinta. The highest notes were hard to play. When these notes were by a shorter nafir (they could be long), the effect was not musical but "excruciating".

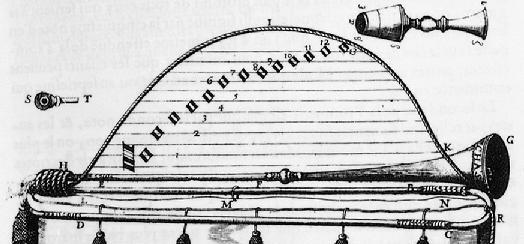
1636 illustration from book by Marin Mersenne, showing notes playable in the natural trumpet. His illustration shows from the 1st to the 13th partial. The clarion range was 8–13 at this time.

In the 16th century, a clareta or "sopranoor clarino" in C was tuned to the 8th partial, c" or c5, and might reach as high as the 13th partial. In a five-trumpet ensemble of trumpets as long as 8 feet, it would be paired with a standard trumpet. The long trumpet was tuned an octave lower, and called sonata, quinta or principale). The other trumpets were the basso trumpet, vulgano trumpet, and alto e basso trumpet.

Trumpets in the 16th century had a narrow range of notes that could be played. The larger straight trumpets, like the buisine likely played one or two notes. The bent-tube trumpets likely had an increased range of about 4 playable notes in the "Late Middle Ages", the "naturals 1-4." Innovations such as the slide trumpet and different mouthpieces helped increase the notes available. Better built trumpets also gained notes as they could increasingly be overblown.

There was less need of the specialized clarion as trumpets improved in the Baroque period. The principal register of the trumpet extended to the seventh pitch of the harmonic series. The trumpet's clarino register then ran from the eighth to the twentieth pitch in the series.

Among today's trumpets, the piccolo trumpet occupies the same position in relation to standard trumpets that the clarion did, tuned one octave above the standard trumpet.

== Ottoman boru ==
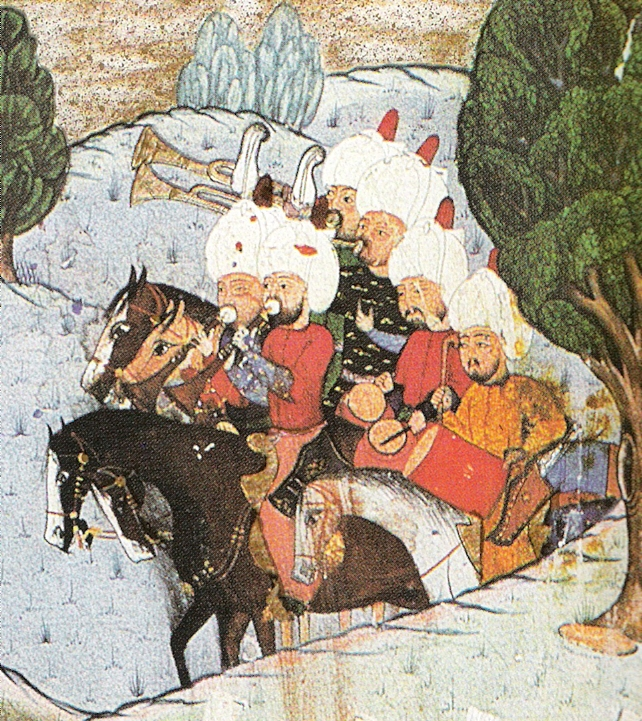
Mehterhâne, Ottoman miniature c. 1568. The musicians play two zurna, two spiral trumpets (boru), a cylinder drum davul and a pair of kettle drums (nakkare). In 1529, the "Turkish field clamor" reached Vienna for the first time.

By the late 1500s, Ottoman armies were playing these new folded trumpets (or natural trumpets) in place of their former nefir trumpets. The nefir was closely related to the añafil.

In today's Turkish, nefir means "trumpet/horn" and "war signal". In military music, the straight natural trumpet nefir is distinguished from the general Turkic word for "tube" and "trumpet," boru. Boru refers to the looped military trumpet, which is due to European influence, while the derived borazan ("trumpeter") is understood today in Turkish folk music as a spirally wound bark oboe.

In the 17th century, when the Ottoman writer Evliya Çelebi (1611 – after 1683) wrote his travelogue Seyahatnâme, the nafīr was a straight trumpet that was played in Constantinople by only 10 musicians and had fallen behind the European boru (also tūrumpata būrūsī), for which Çelebi states 77 musicians. Nefir, or nüfür in religious folk music, was a simple buffalo horn without a mouthpiece, blown by Bektashi in ceremonies and by itinerant dervishes for begging until the early 20th century.

== Gallery ==
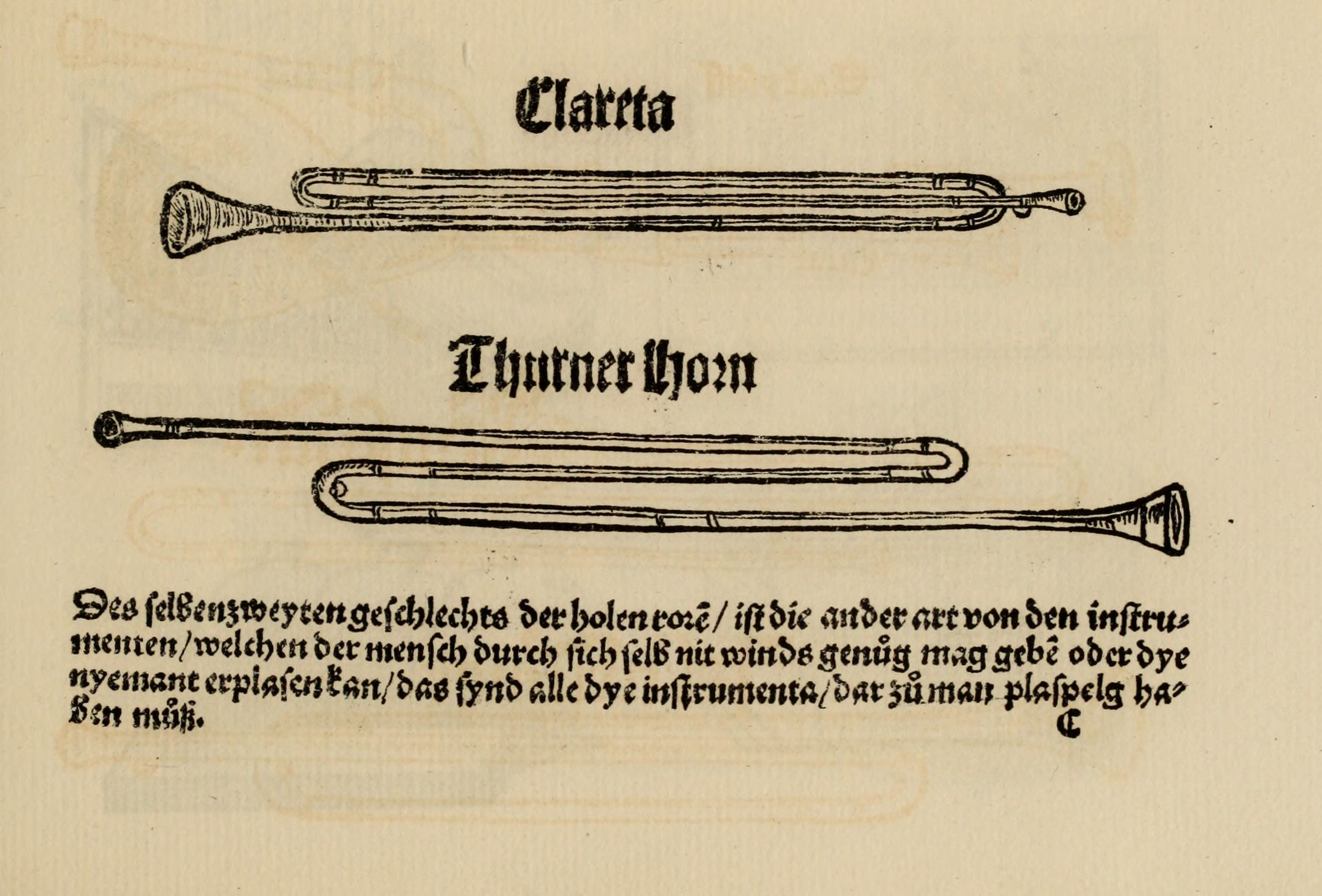
Virdung illustrated (1511 AD) bent trumpets including clareta, thin tubed to produce high notes. Thurner horn; may be thürmer (tower), as in tower watchmen.

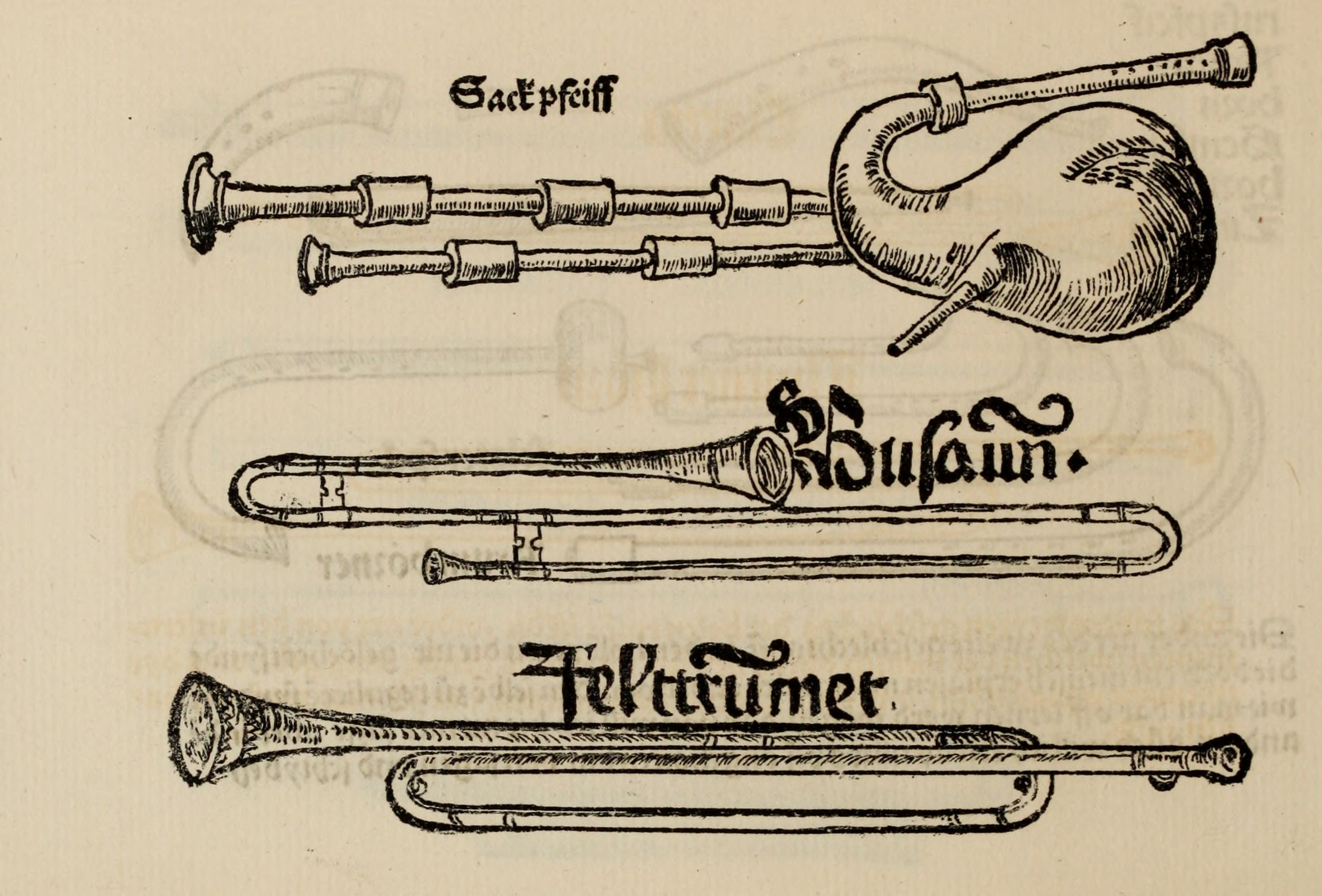
Virdung illustrated (1511 AD) bent trumpets including felttrumet (field trumpet) and busaun (sackbut).

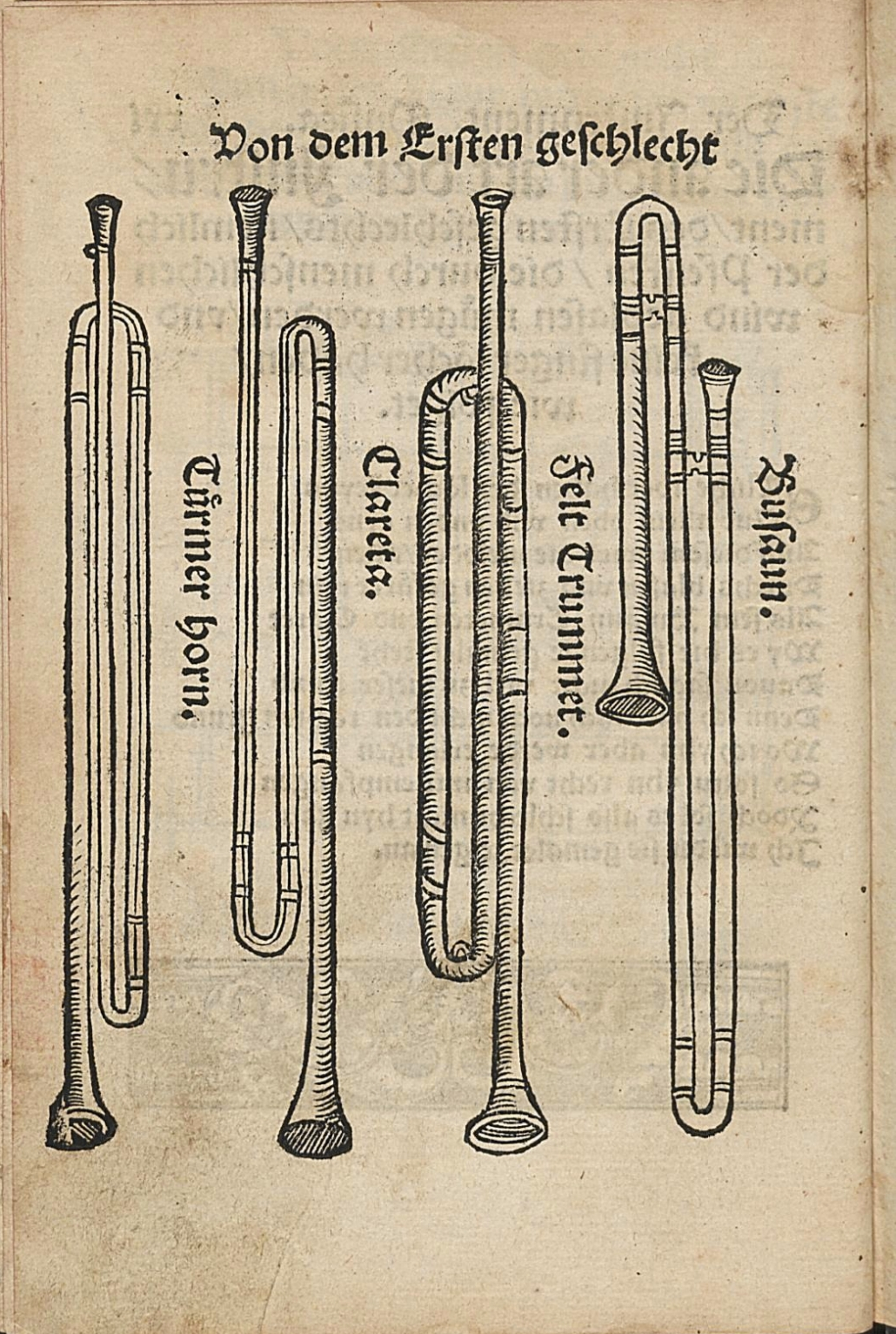
1529 AD Trumpets from Martin Agricola's book Musica instrumentalis deudsch

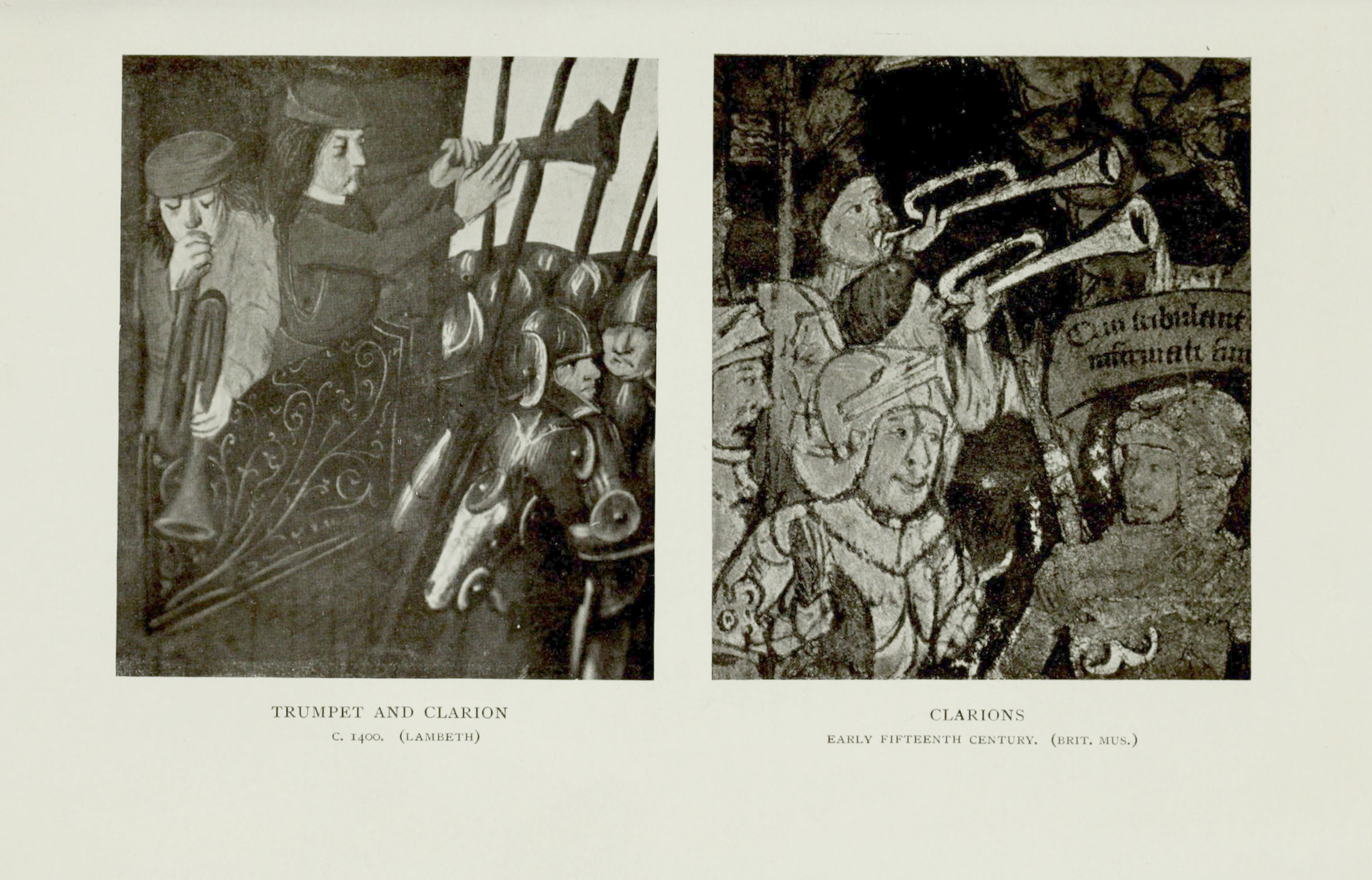
Clarions displayed in Old English instruments of music by Francis William Galpin. Left c. 1400, right early 1400s, England.

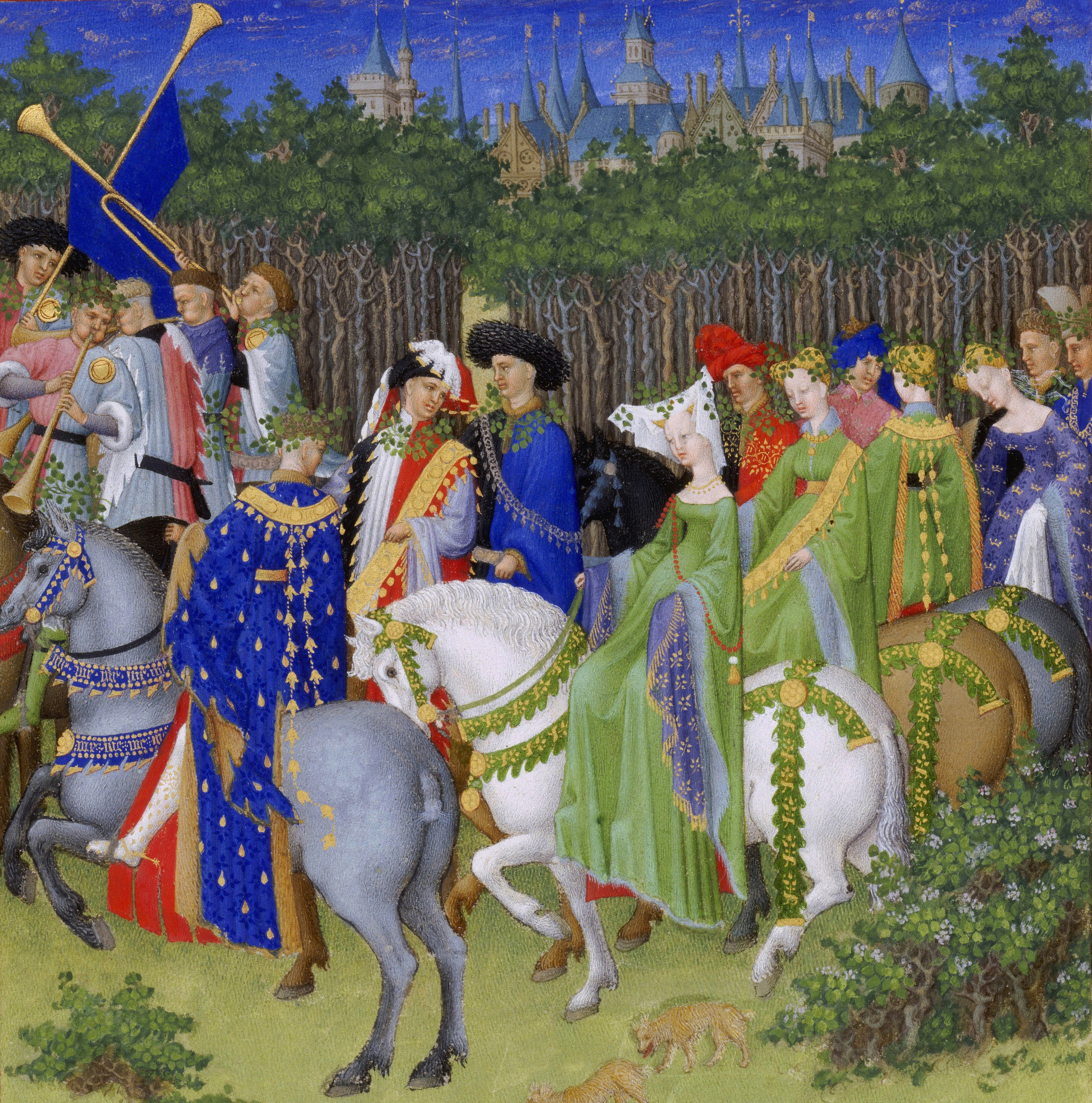
Clarion trumpet, buisine trumpet, 2 shawms. Painted in France between 1412 and 1416. (upper left corner). Clarion matches felttrumet in Virdung's 1511 illustration.

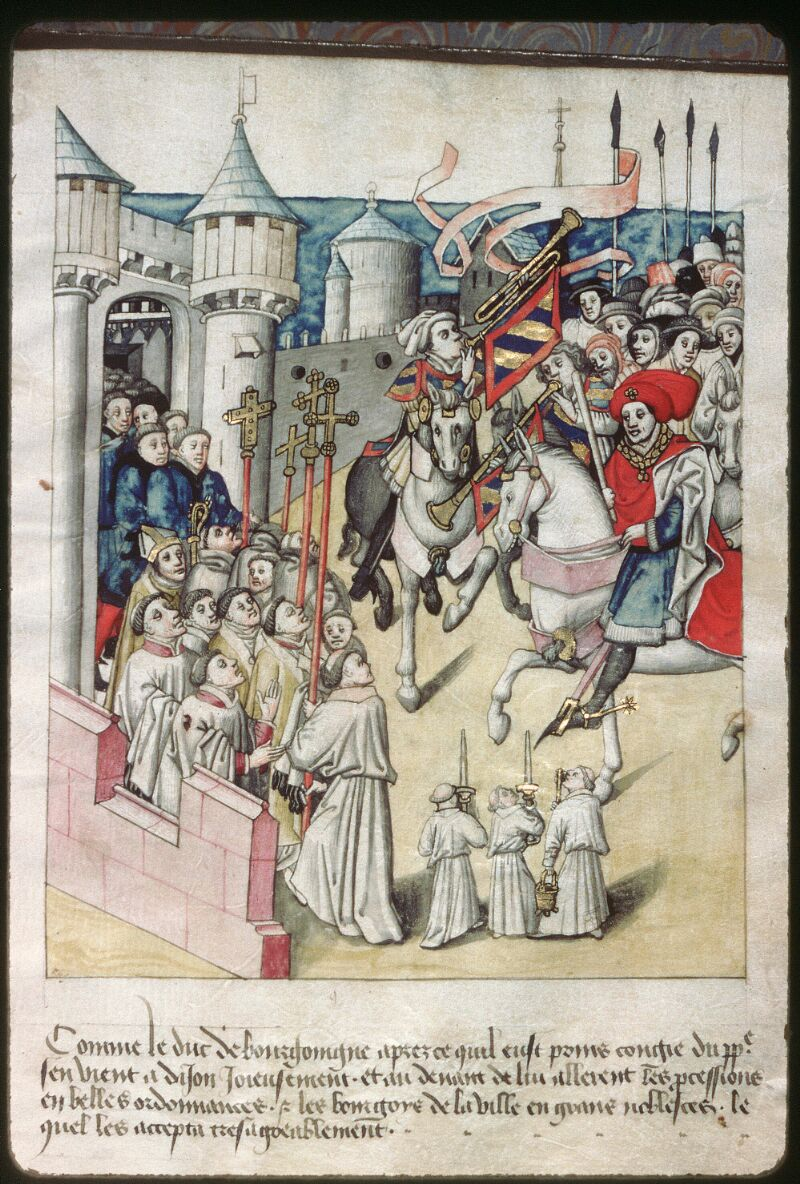
Buisine player and clarion player at religious ceremony, Manuscript of Saint-Esprit, 1450–1460, France. Clarion matches Thurner horn in Virdung's 1511 illustration.

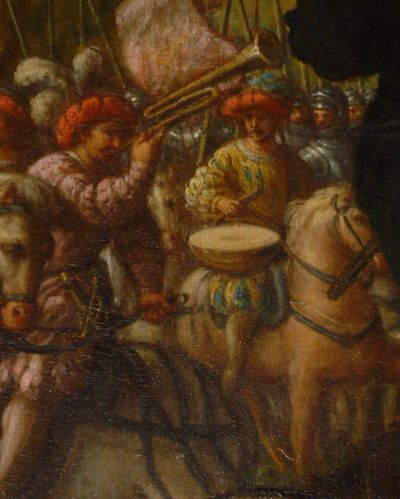
Painting from Munich, c. 15th century AD. S-curved trumpet paired with timpani kettle drums

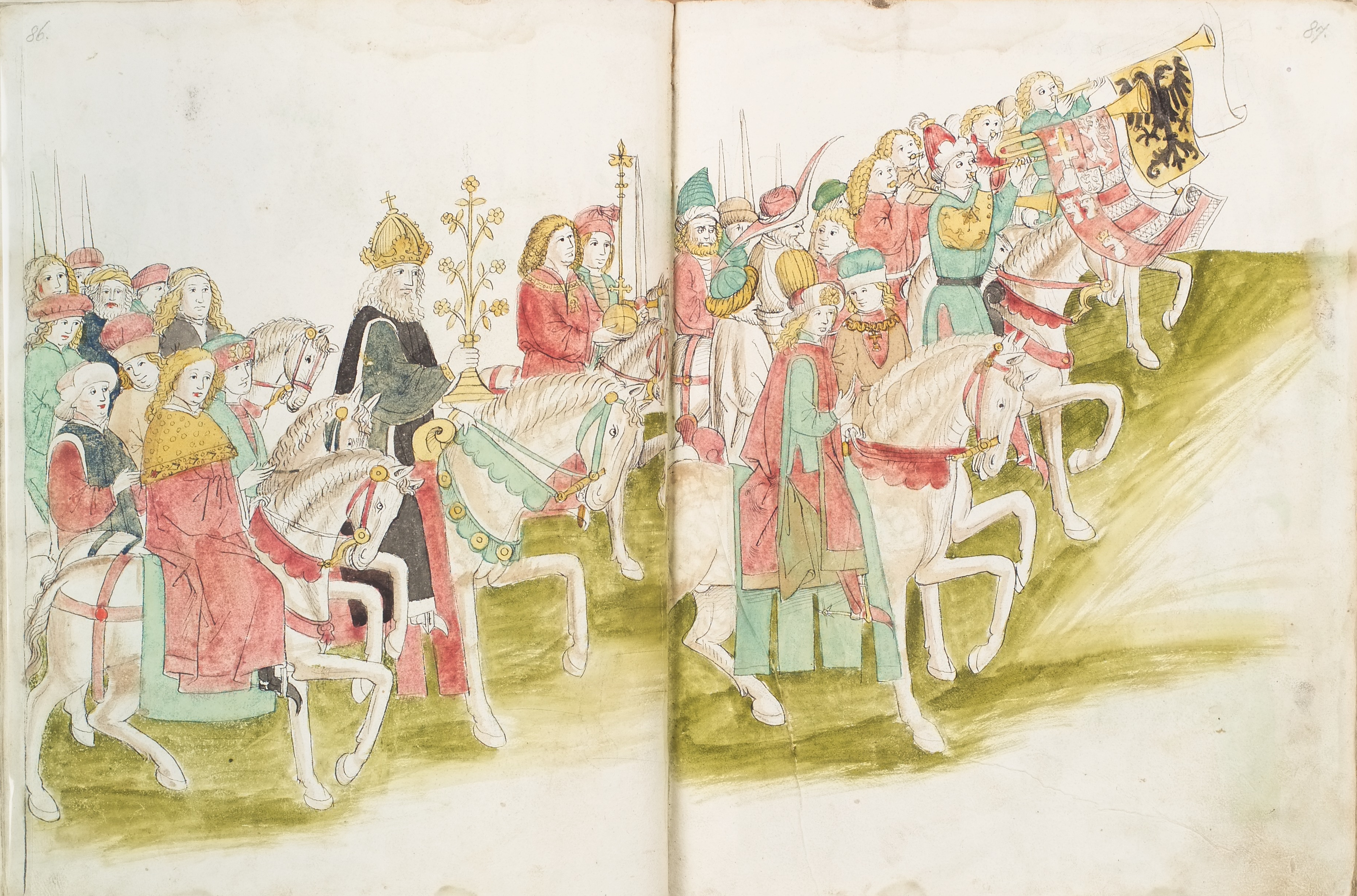
1460 AD. A mix of different-sized business (far right) playing ahead of Holy Roman Emperor Sigismund. One trumpet resembles the thurner horn.

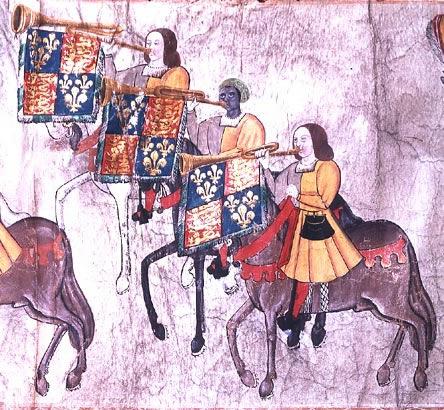
1511. Herald trumpeters of Henry VIII blowing looped business or clarions. Middle trumpeter is thought to be John Blanke, an African in service to Catherine of Aragon.

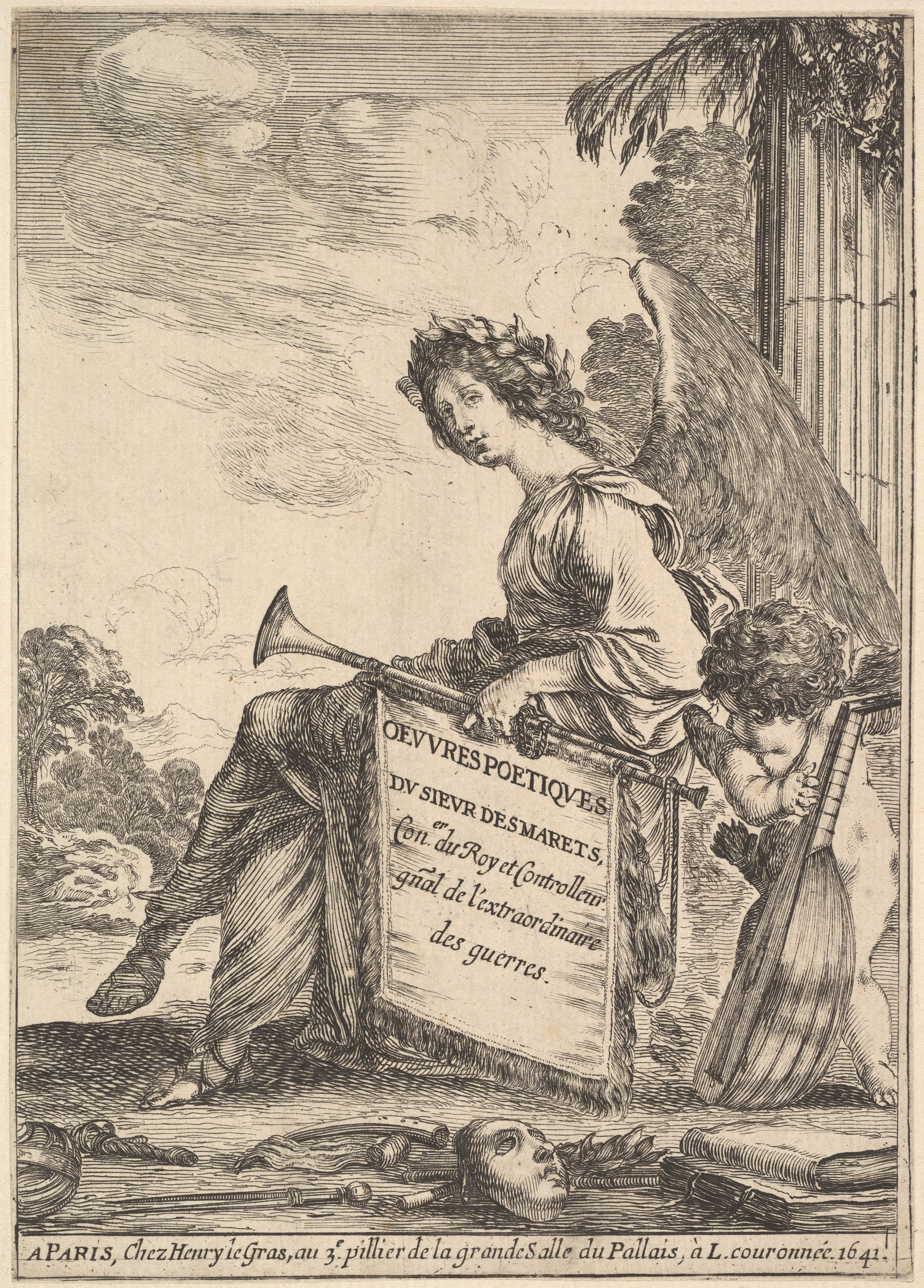
1641 AD. Woman Holding a clareta or clarion.

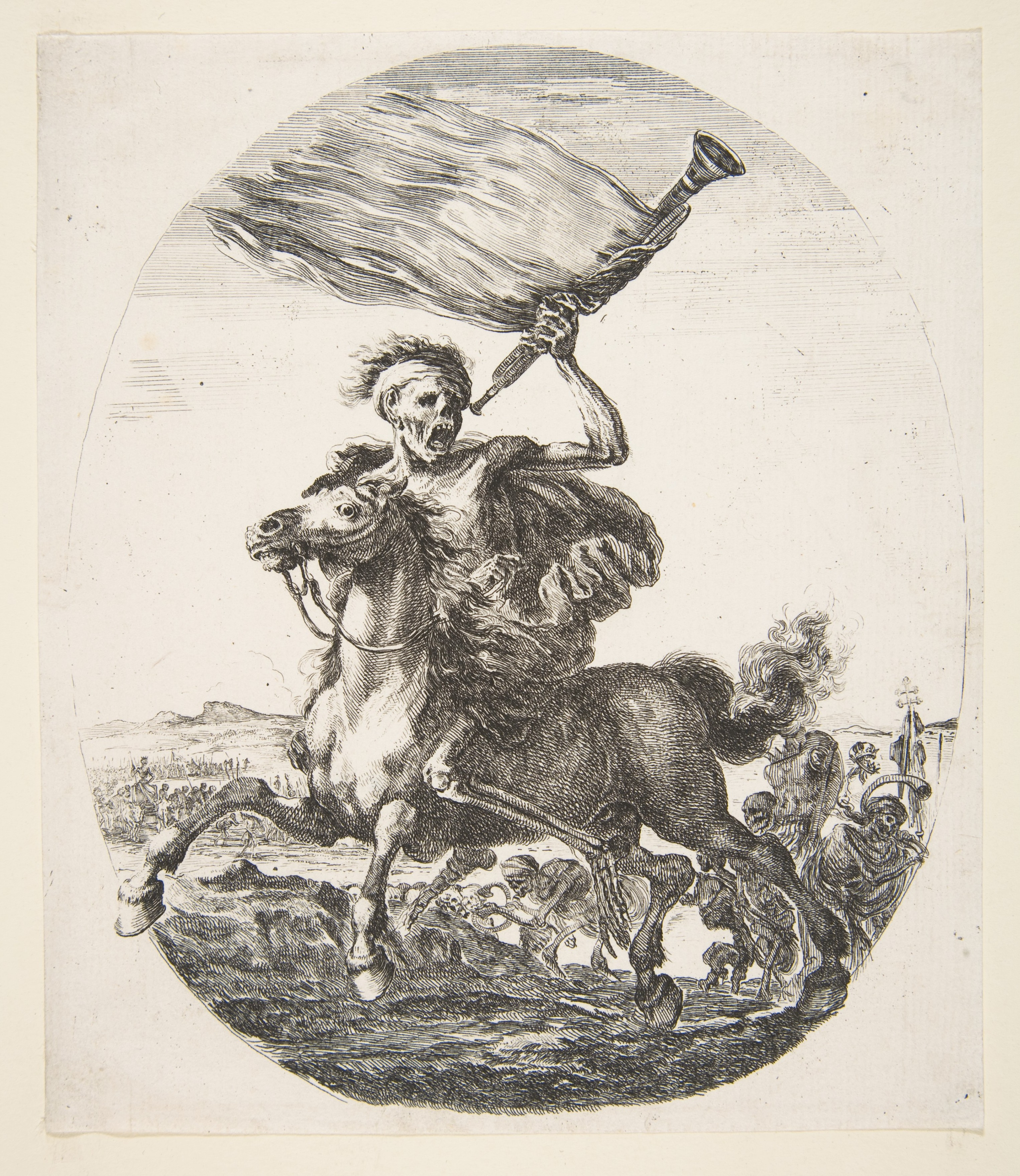
c. 1648. Death playing a clareta or clarion.

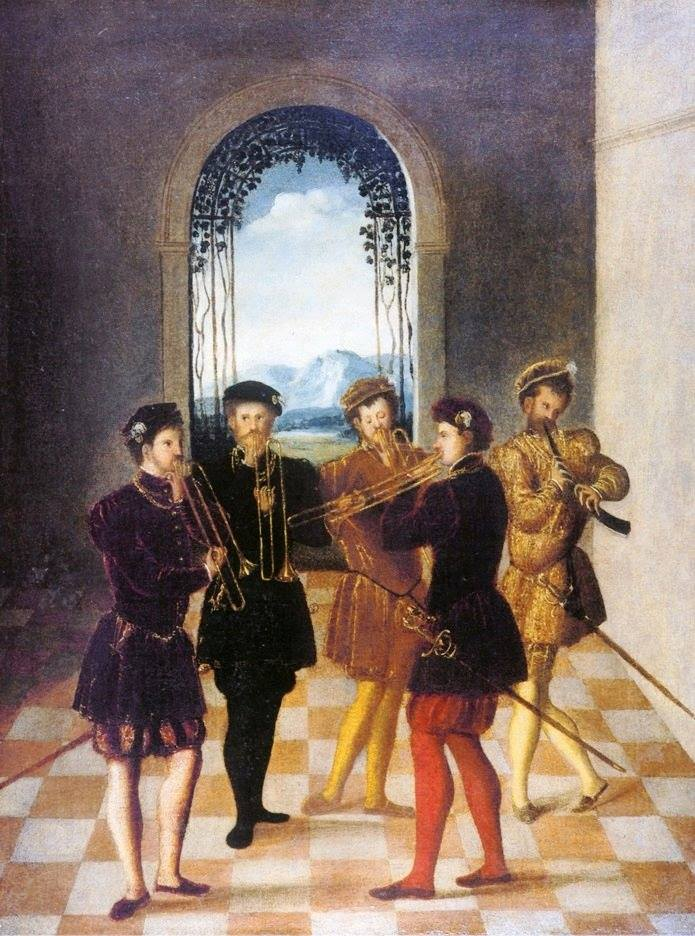
Trumpets that appear to be like Virdung's busaun. Possibly slide trumpets. Far right is a curved cornett.

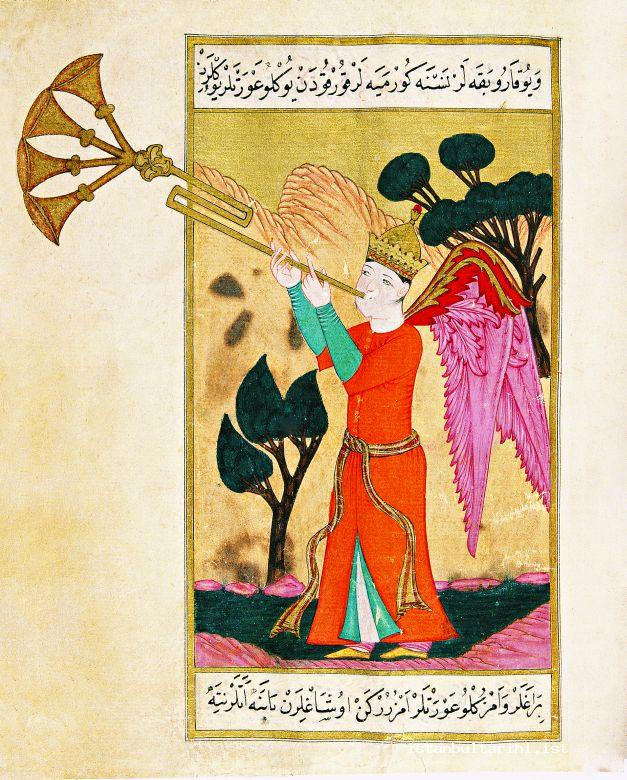
As European bent-tube instruments spread, Islamic countries began applying the technique to their own trumpets, even in fantastic imagery. 16th century AD.

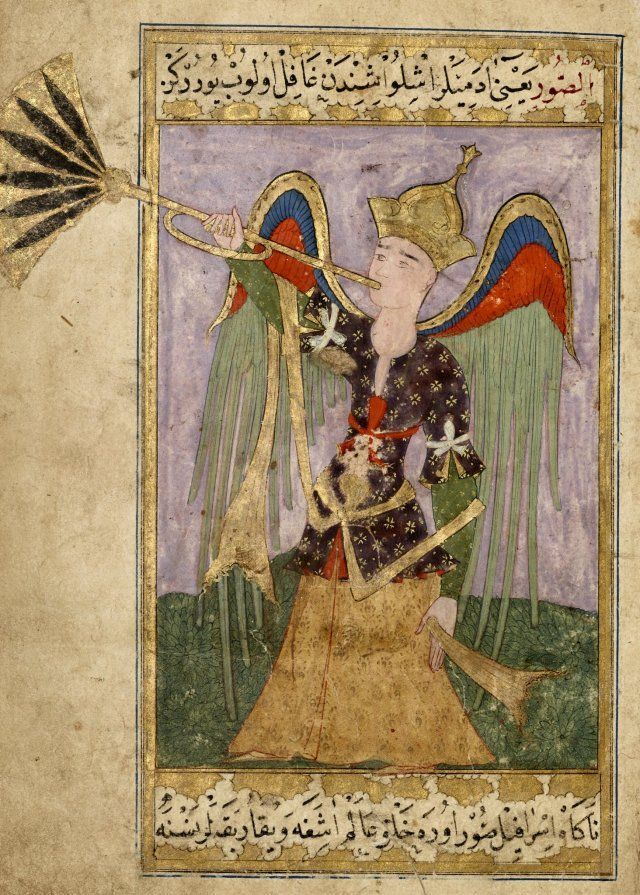
The Turkish boru, made from bending a trumpet into a loop, also made became an instrument of angels. Late 16th – early 17th century AD.

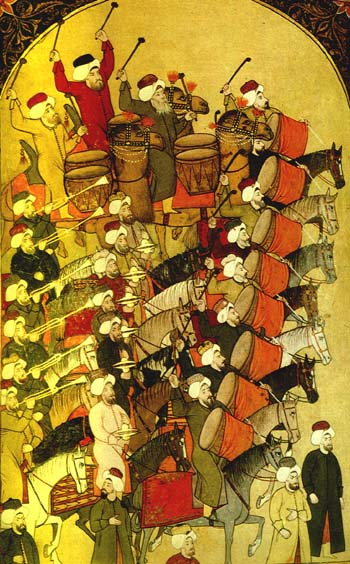
Turkish miniature from the Surname-ı Vehbi (1720 AD) showing boru trumpets, far left

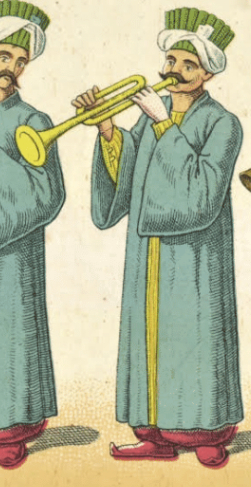
Boru trumpet, Turkey, 1907, part of the Mehter military band

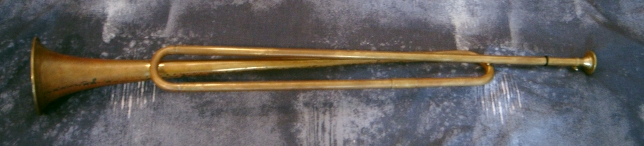
Slide trumpet replica. When trumpets only had a narrow range of playable notes, the slide trumpet allowed that range to increase. The tube that slides is where the mouthpiece enters; pulling it in and out changes the length of the trumpet, changing its key.

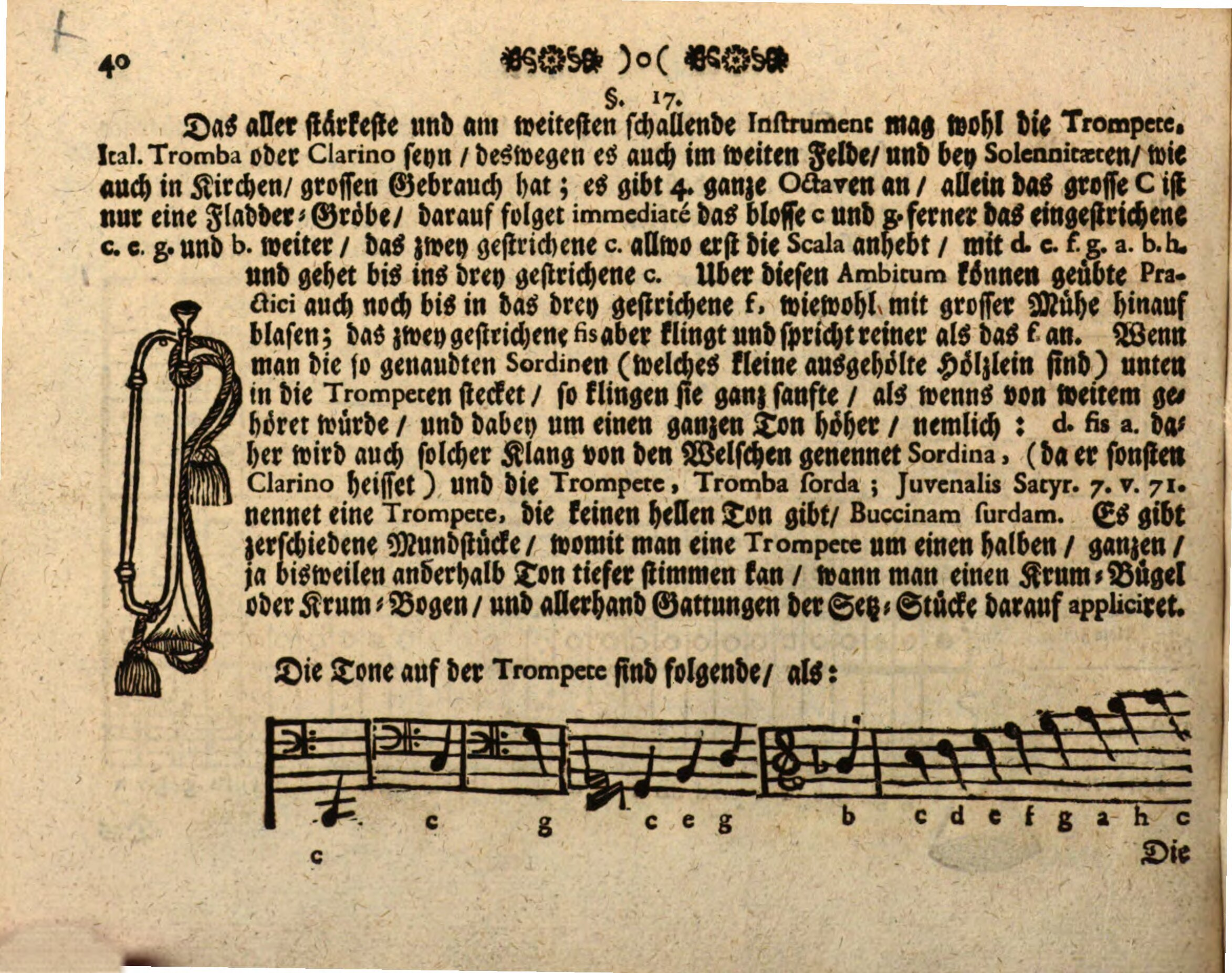
By 1732, the clarion had become the natural trumpet in music instruction books. Museum musicum theoreticalo practicum

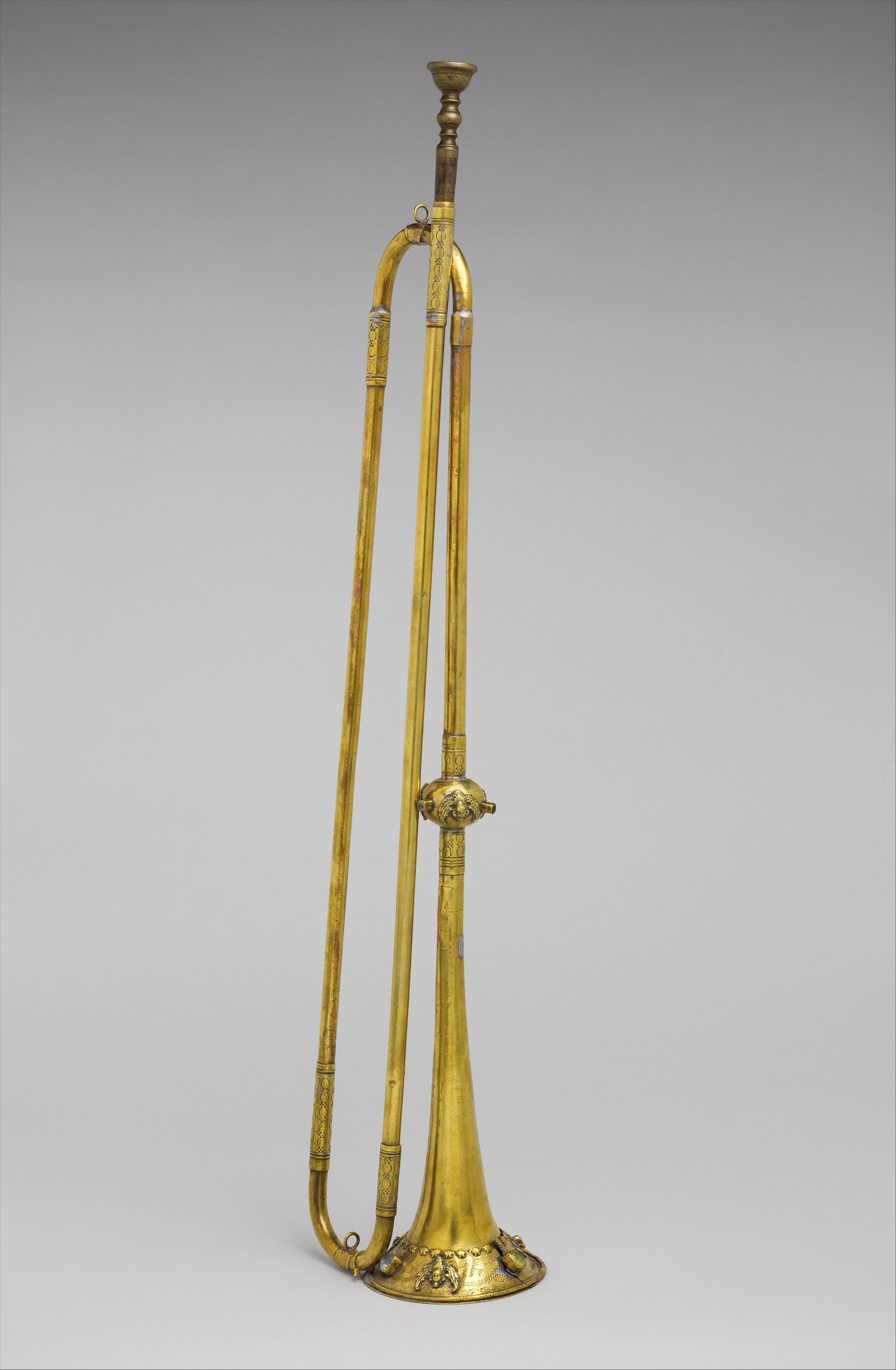
Natural trumpet, 1790 AD

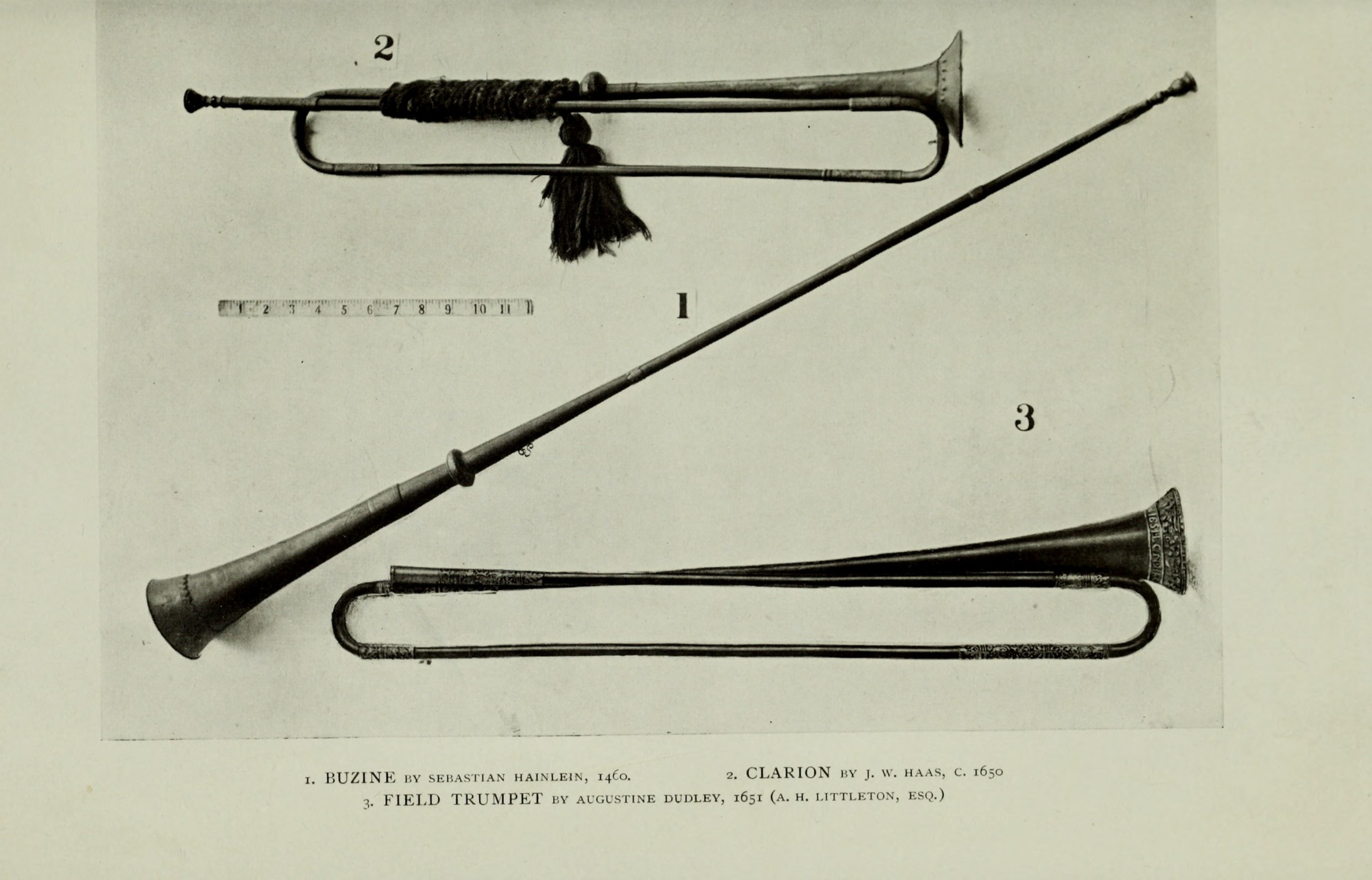
Buisine, clarion (a natural trumpet), and field trumpet, from Francis W. Galpin book Old English instruments of music. The latter two instruments are a latter stage of the clarion.

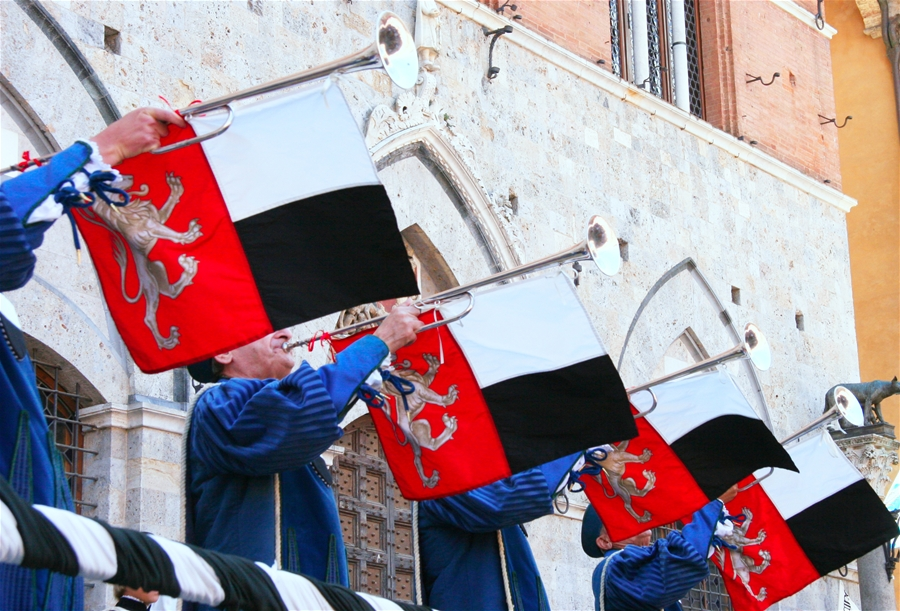
Italian chiarine. This instrument has no valves.

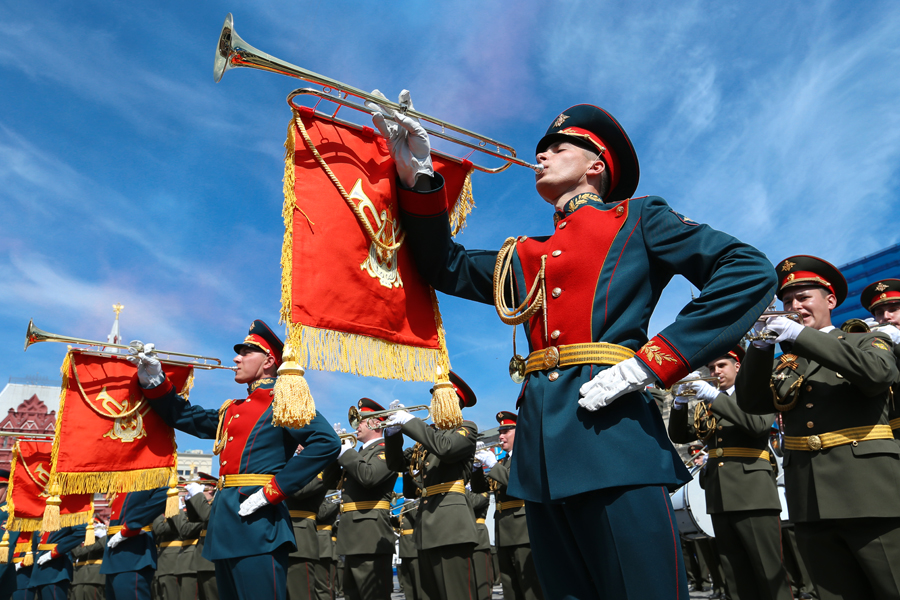
Russian fanfare trumpets, played by Russian soldiers. These trumpets have no valves.

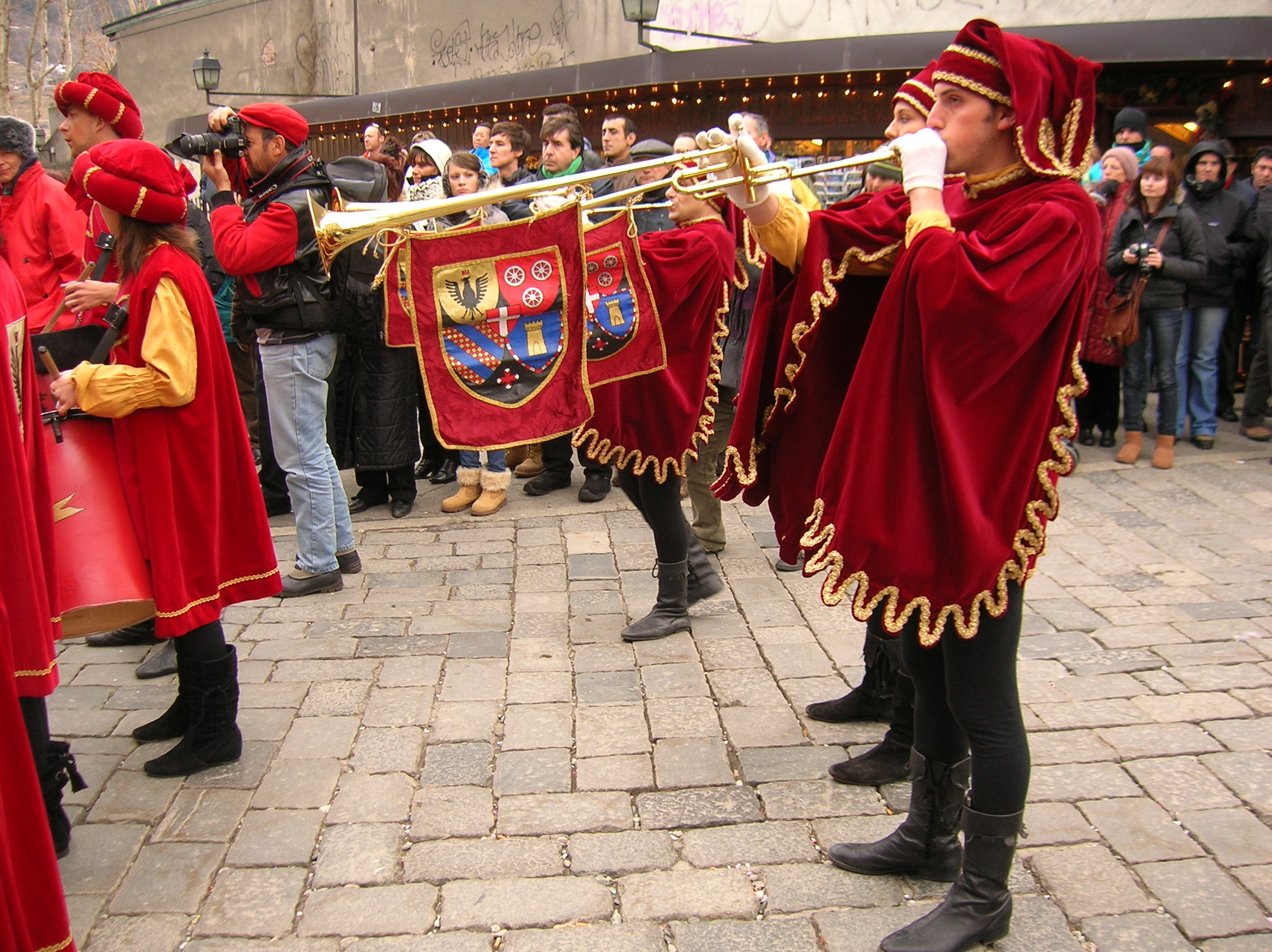
A trumpeter in medieval costume plays a trumpet with a piston. This type of single-valved clarion was specially designed for the performance of the "Triumphal March" of Giuseppe Verdi 's Aida.

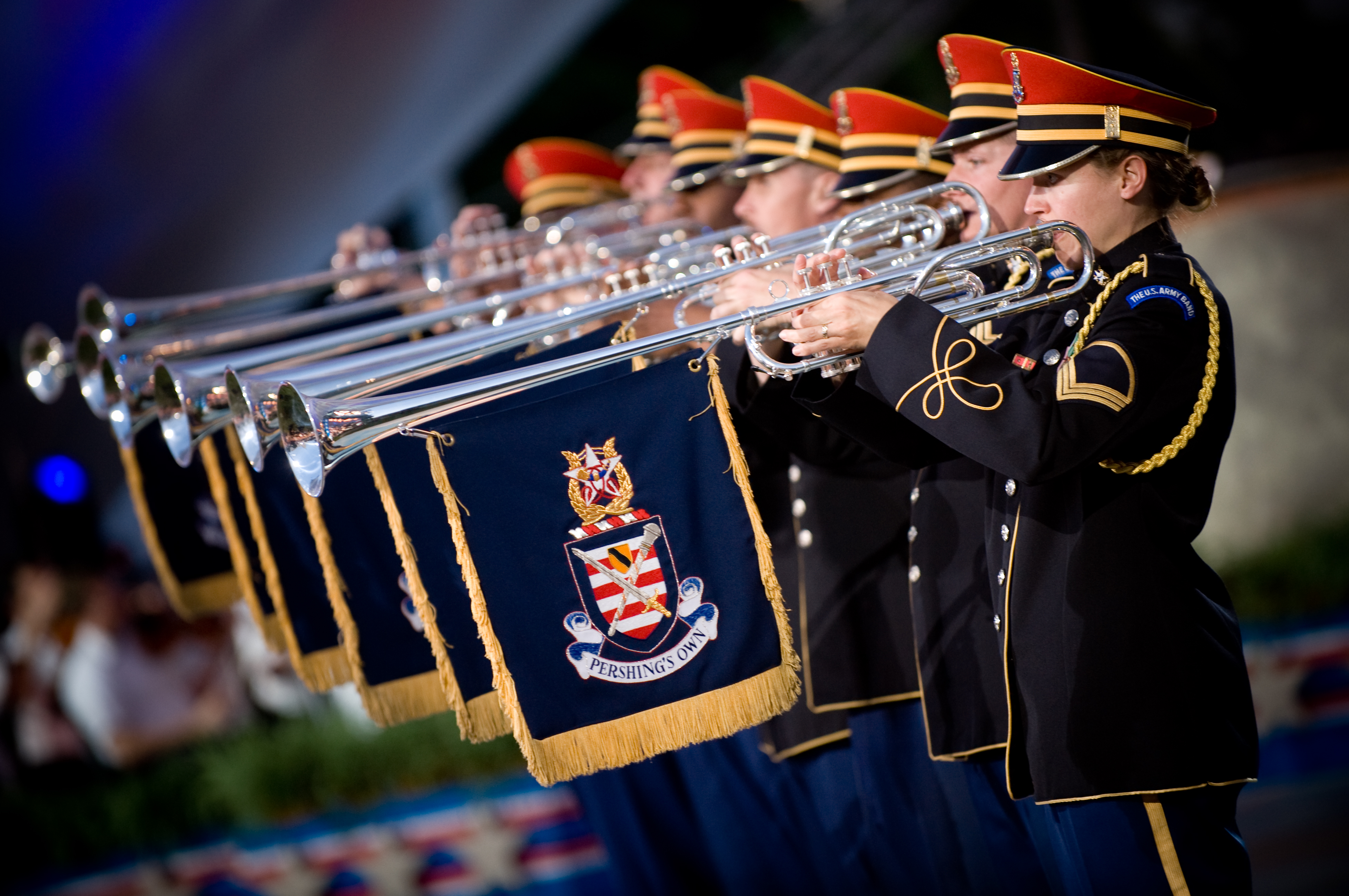
Fanfare trumpet used by the U.S. Army Herald Trumpets, 2008. These trumpets have valves.
