= Slide trumpet =

Historical type of trumpet with a single sliding section of tubing

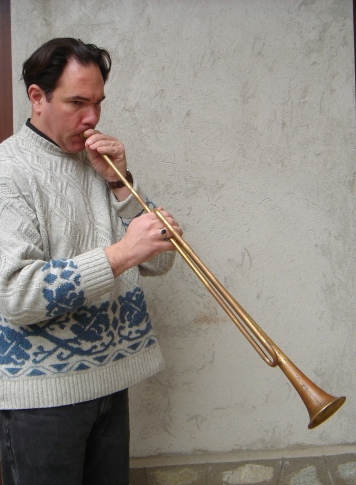
Modern reconstruction of a fifteenth-century slide trumpet

The slide trumpet is an early type of trumpet fitted with a movable section of telescopic tubing, similar to the slide of a trombone. Eventually, the slide trumpet evolved into the sackbut, which evolved into the modern-day trombone. The key difference between these two instruments is that the slide trumpet possesses only a single slide joint, rather than the two joints in the U-shaped slide of the sackbut or trombone. There are several types of slide trumpet of different places and eras.

== Early instrument ==
The slide trumpet grew out of the war trumpet as used and developed in Western and Central Europe: Don Smithers argues that the slide grew out of the detachable leadpipe, and separated the use of the trumpet as a dance instrument from the trumpet as a signaling device in war.

== Renaissance slide trumpet ==
See: Clarion

As no instruments from this period are known to have survived, the details—and even the existence—of a Renaissance slide trumpet is a matter of some conjecture, and there continues to be some debate among scholars. Some slide trumpet designs saw use in England in the 18th century.

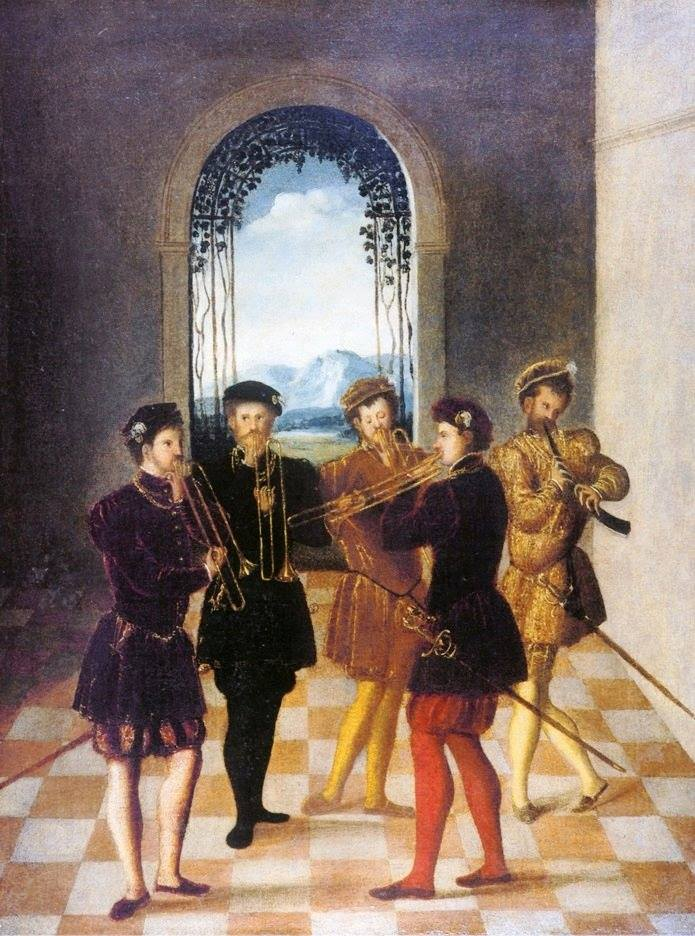
Possibly slide trumpets or sackbuts or clarion trumpets.

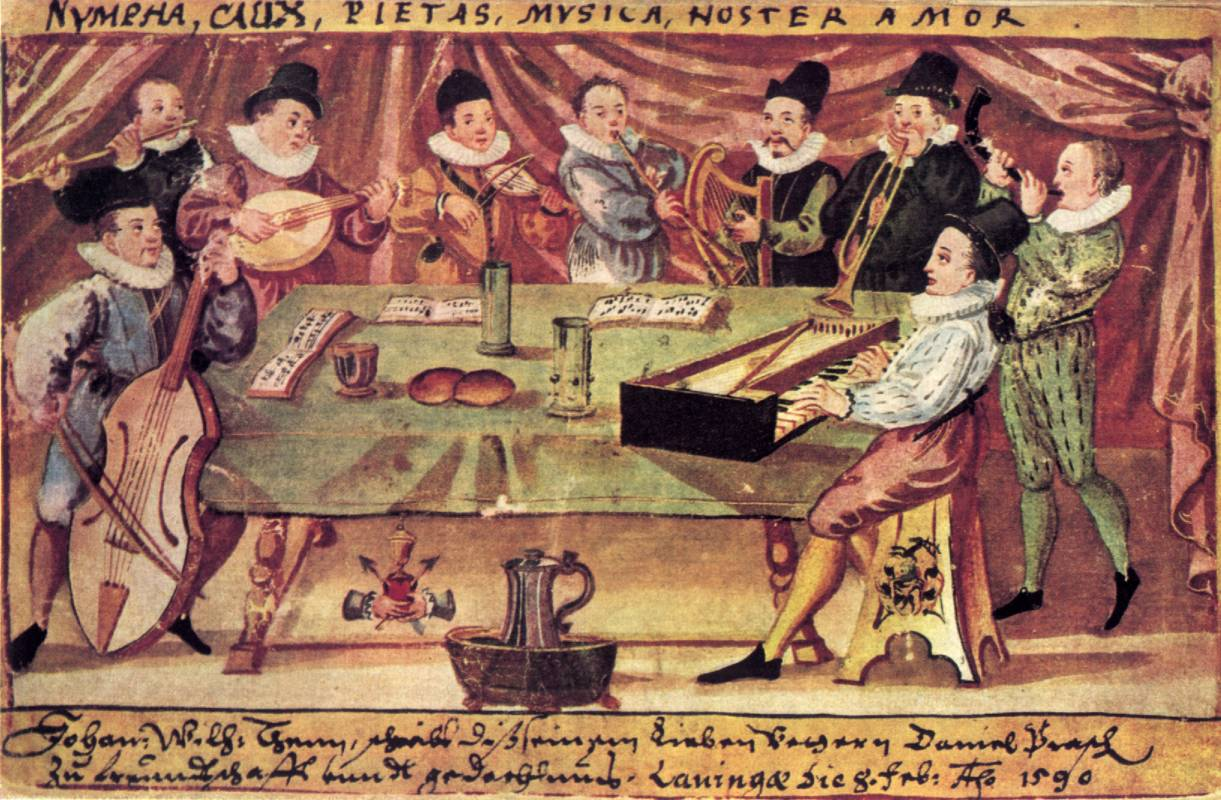
Collegium Musicum musical gathering, circa 1590. From the left: viol, flute, mandörgen or gittern, fiddle or rebec, shawm, harp, slide trumpet or clarion trumpet, cornett, clavichord.
