= Horn (instrument) =

Family of musical instruments

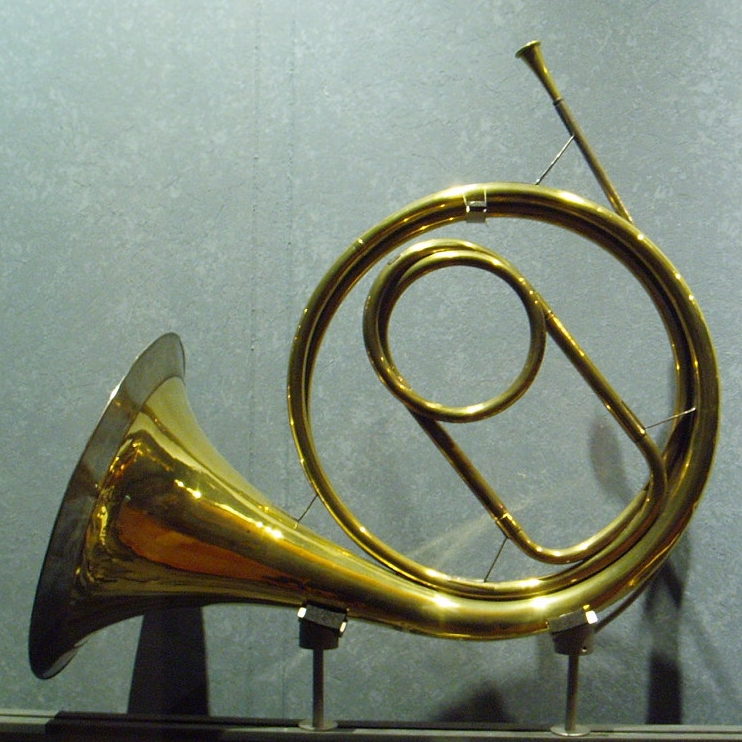
A natural horn, with central crook: a cor solo, Raoux, Paris, 1797

A horn is any of a family of musical instruments made of a tube, usually made of metal and often curved in various ways, with one narrow end into which the musician blows, and a wide end from which sound emerges. In horns, unlike some other brass instruments such as the trumpet, the bore gradually increases in width through most of its length—that is to say, it is conical rather than cylindrical. In jazz and popular-music contexts, the word may be used loosely to refer to any wind instrument, and a section of brass or woodwind instruments, or a mixture of the two, is called a horn section in these contexts.

== Types ==
Variations include:

- Lur (prehistoric)
- Shofar
- Alboka
- Roman horns:
  - Cornu
  - Buccina
- Dung chen
- Dord
- Sringa
- Nyele
- Wazza
- Waqra phuku
- Alphorn
- Cornett
- Serpent
- Ophicleide
- Natural horn
  - Bugle
  - Post horn
- French horn
- German horn
- Vienna horn
- Wagner tuba
- Saxhorns, including:
  - Alto horn (UK: tenor horn), pitched in E♭
  - Baritone horn, pitched in B♭
- Valved bugles, including
  - contrabass bugle
- Tuba
- Sousaphone

== History ==
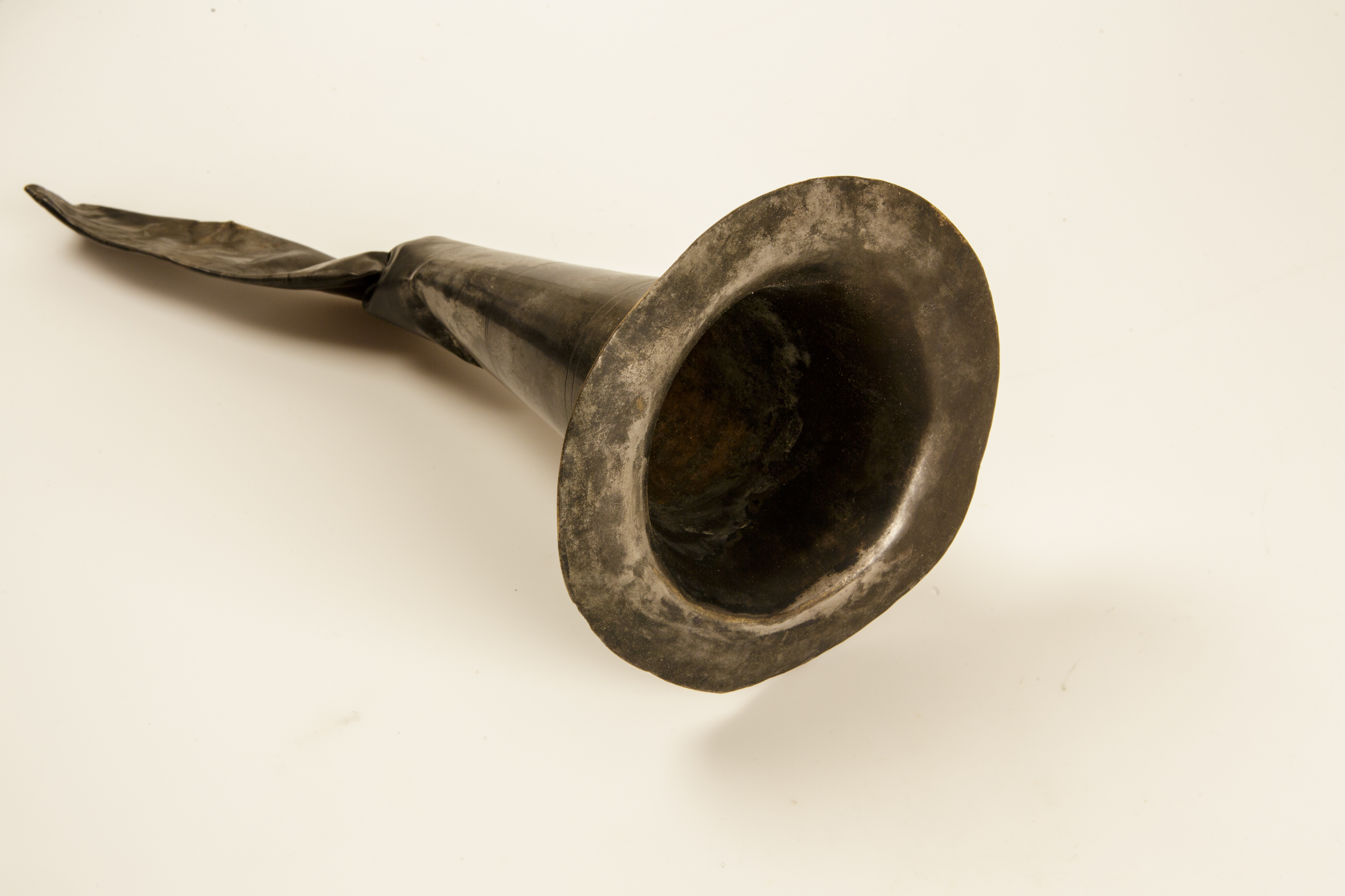
Army signal horn, (cornu), Roman period; found in Alphen aan den Rijn, the Netherlands

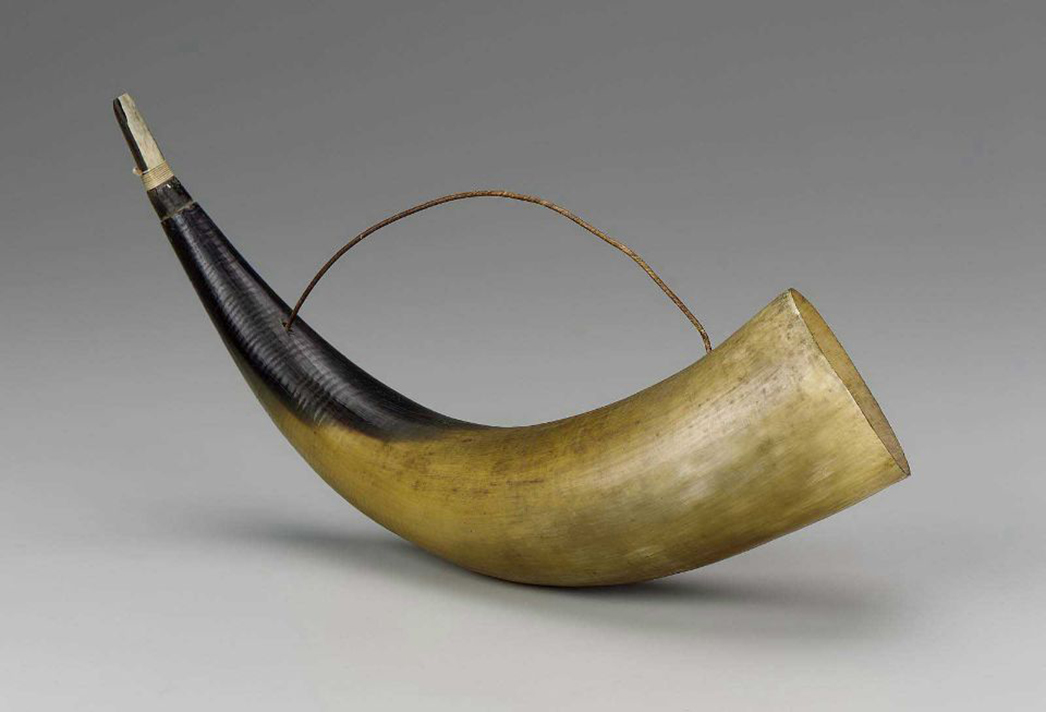
An instrument for creating sound made from the horn of an animal

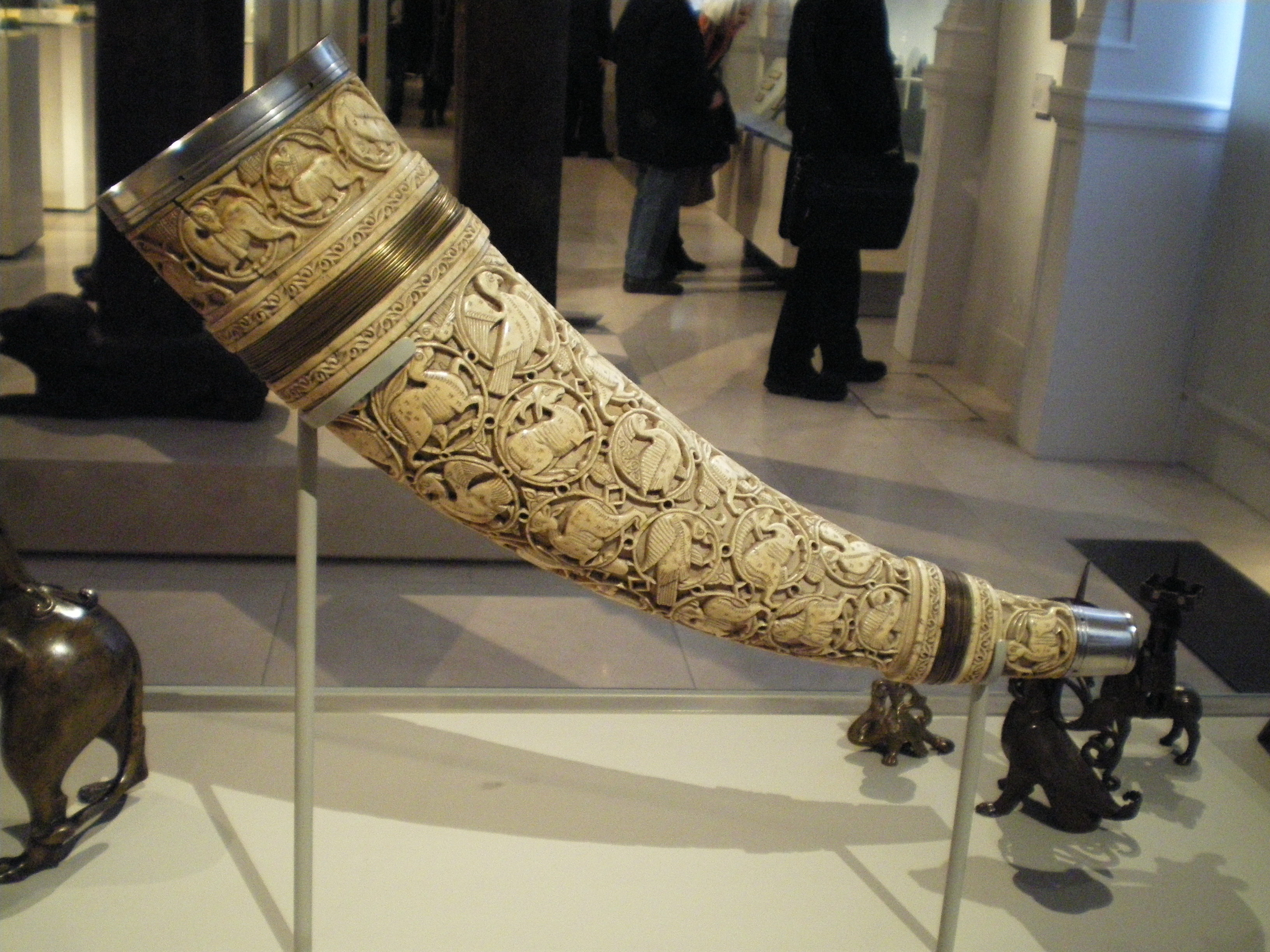
Olifant, possibly southern Italian, 11th century

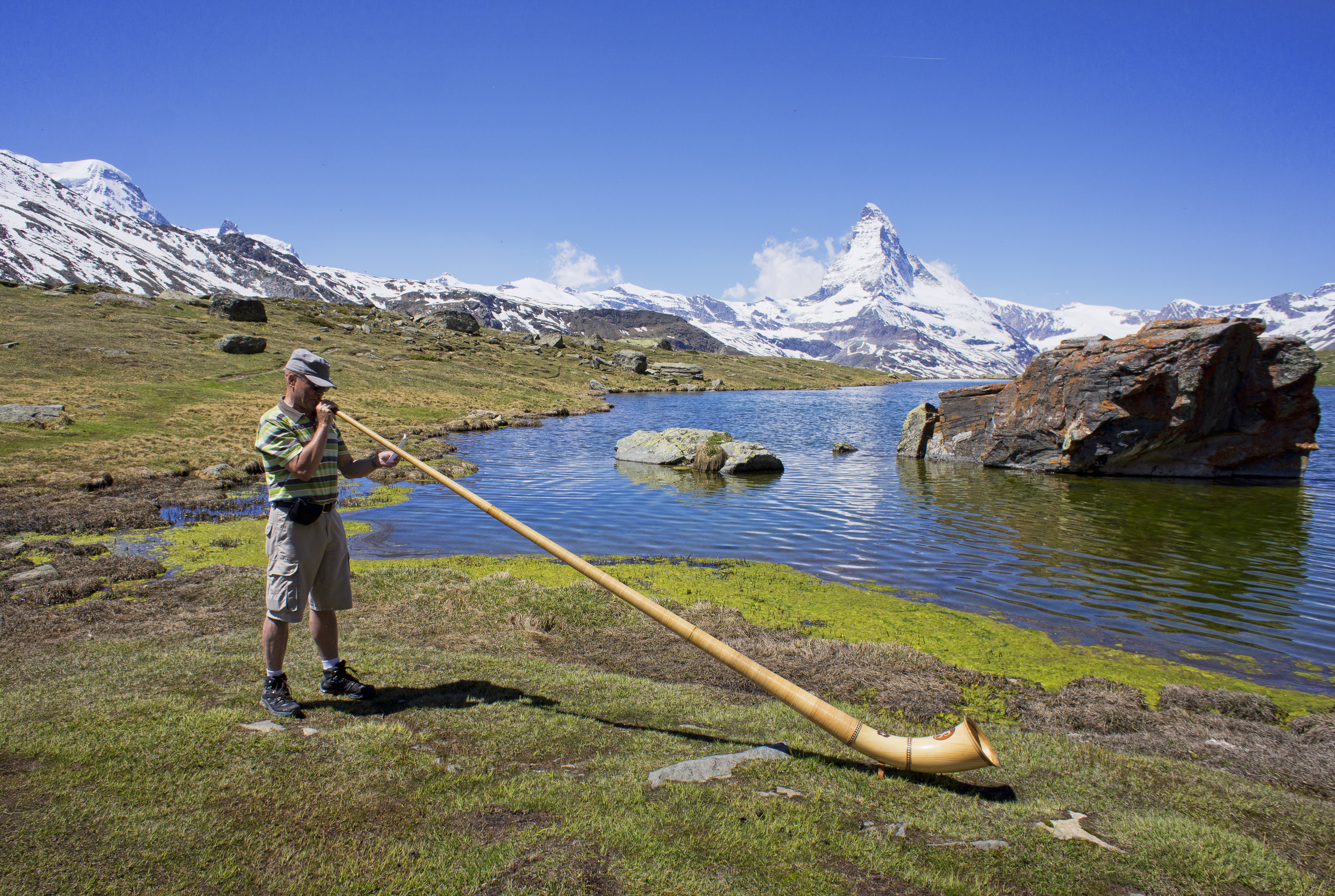
Alphorn player near Zermatt

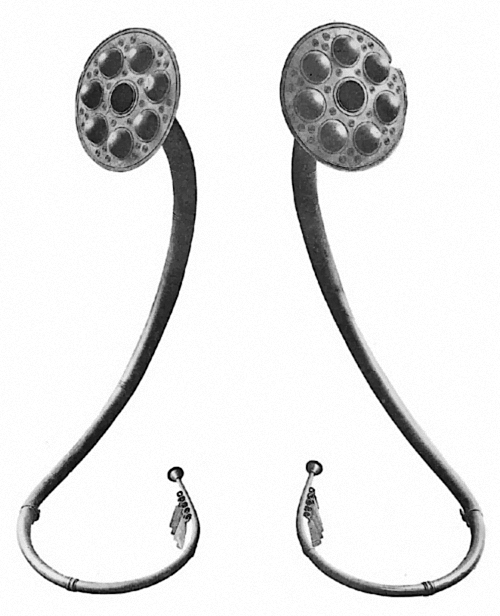
Pair of the Brudevælte Lurs, excavated 1797

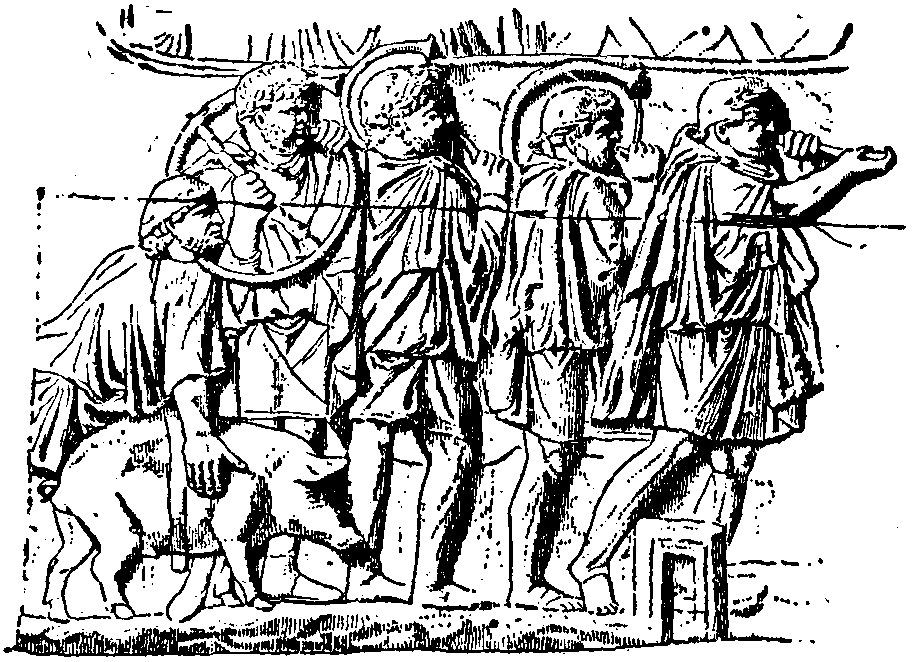
Cornicen (horn players) from Trajan's Column

As the name indicates, people originally used to blow on the actual horns of animals before starting to emulate them in metal or other materials. This original usage survives in the shofar (Hebrew: שופר), a ram's horn, which plays an important role in Jewish religious rituals. The genus of animal-horn instruments to which the shofar belongs is called קרן (keren) in Hebrew, qarnu in Akkadian, and κέρας (keras) in Greek.

The olifant or oliphant (an abbreviation of the French cor d'olifant/oliphant, "elephant horn") was the name applied in the Middle Ages to ivory hunting or signalling horns made from elephants' tusks. Apparently of Asian origin, they reached Europe from Byzantium in the tenth or eleventh century, and are first mentioned in French literature in the early 12th century. In Europe they came to be symbols of royalty.

From late antiquity there are mentions of "alpine horns", but the earliest secure description of the wooden instrument now called an "alphorn" dates from the sixteenth century. This description by the naturalist Conrad Gessner calls the instrument a lituus alpinus and says it is "nearly eleven feet long, made from two pieces of wood slightly curved and hollowed out, fitted together and skillfully bound with osiers". Nevertheless, one modern authority says that at the time it was a straight instrument eleven feet long, and this form persisted in Austria until the nineteenth century. The more familiar form, with an upturned bell, was developed in Switzerland in the eighteenth century. The practice of making these instruments in different sizes, to be played together in part music, originated in 1826. Similar wooden instruments, used by shepherds for signalling, are known in Romania by the name bucium. They are made in straight, hooked, and S-shaped forms, in lengths between 1.5 and 3 meters. A variant of the straight version is called tulnic.

Metal instruments modelled on animal horns survive from as early as the 10th century BC, in the form of lurer (a modern name devised by archaeologists). Nearly fifty of these curved bronze horns have been excavated from burial sites, mostly in Scandinavia, since the first was discovered in 1797. Many are in unison pairs, curved in opposite directions. Because their makers left no written histories, their use and manner of playing is unknown. The lur was likely known to the Etruscans, noted as bronze-workers from the 8th century BC, who in turn were credited by the Romans with the invention of their horns and trumpets, including long curved horns in the form of a letter C or G. Depictions of these instruments are found from the 5th century BC onward on Etruscan funerary monuments. The Etruscan name for them is unknown, but the Romans called them buccina and cornu. The latter name is the Latin word for "horn", and the source of the name of the musical instrument in many Romance languages: French cor, Italian corno, Provençal corn. Very old metal instruments similar in form to both the lurer and the cornu, often also with ceremonial or military uses, are known on the Indian subcontinent by a variety of names: ramsinga, ransingha, sringa, ranasringa (Sanskrit for "war-horn"), kurudutu, and kombu.

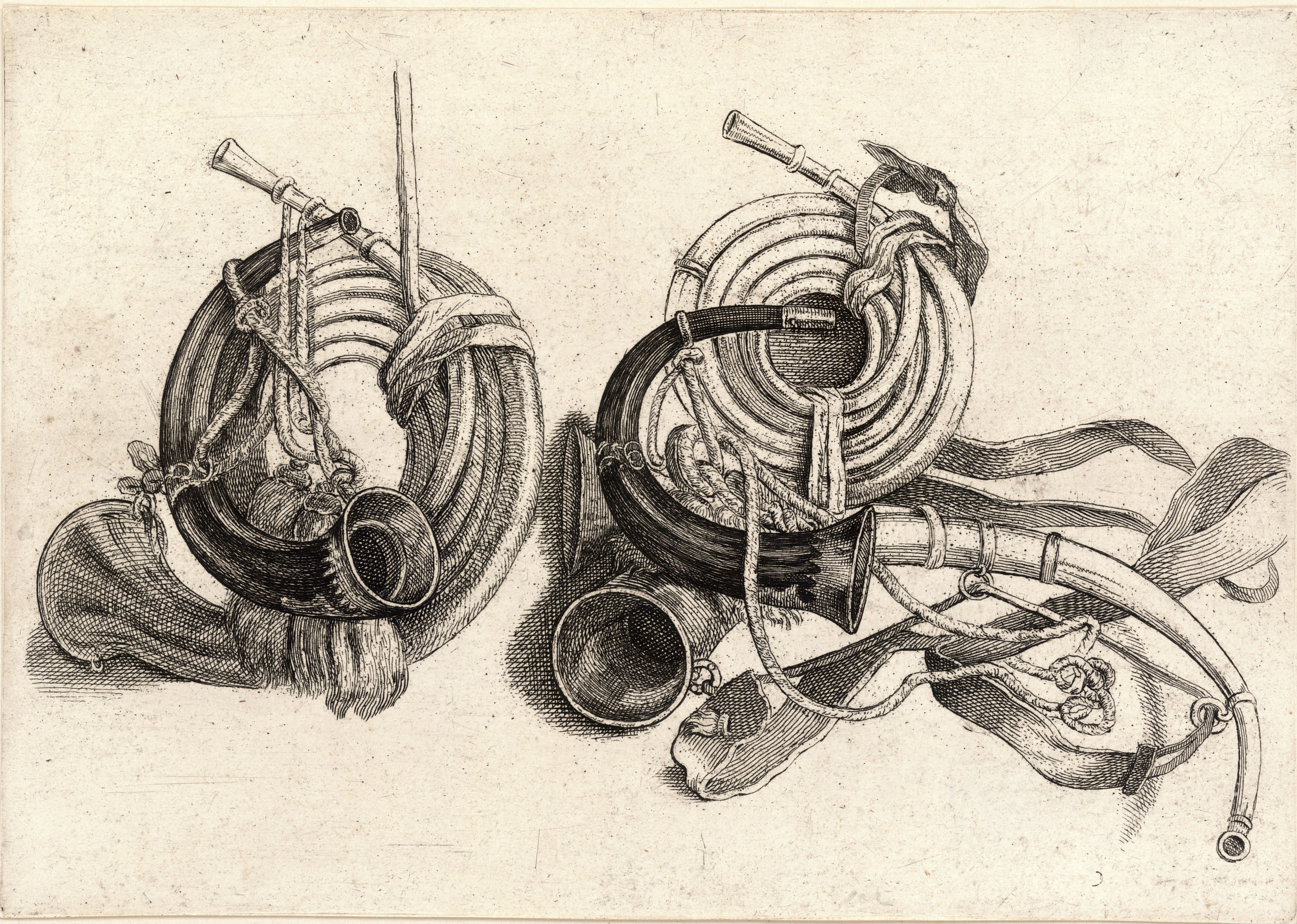
Crescent-shaped trompes and cors à plusieurs tours

Early metal horns were less complex than modern horns. By the early 17th century, there were two main types of hunting horns, both designed to deal with the problem of providing a tube long enough to allow playing higher partials, while at the same time allowing the instruments to be played on horseback. Marin Mersenne calls these trompe, made in a crescent shape, and the cor à plusieurs tours, a tightly coiled instrument in spiral form. The tightly coiled (or spiral) form of horn was never very popular in France, but both there and in Germany was usually called a "trumpet". In German, the word "trumpet" was usually qualified by "Italian" or "hunting", to distinguish these coiled horns from the military or courtly trumpet, though spiral trumpets (sometimes called trombae brevae) pitched in D and played in clarino style also existed. The earliest surviving horn of the tightly spiralled type, dating from about 1570, is by Valentin Springer, though it is described as early as 1511 by Sebastian Virdung. Around the middle of the seventeenth century instruments began to appear in the form of brass tubes wound into a single open hoop, with a flared exit opening (the bell). Although these came to be associated especially with France, the first known example was made in 1667 by the German maker Starck, in Nuremberg. In French, they were most often called trompe de chasse, though cor de chasse is also frequently found. In Germany, they came to be called Waldhörner. Because these horns were intended to be played on horseback during a hunt the mouthpiece was not removable. It was soldered to a mouthpipe, which in turn was often soldered to the body of the instrument and strengthened by a crosspiece, as was also the bell, rendering the horn more solid. The sound they produced was called a recheat. Change of pitch was effected entirely by the lips (the horn not being equipped with valves until the 19th century). Without valves, only the notes within the harmonic series are available.

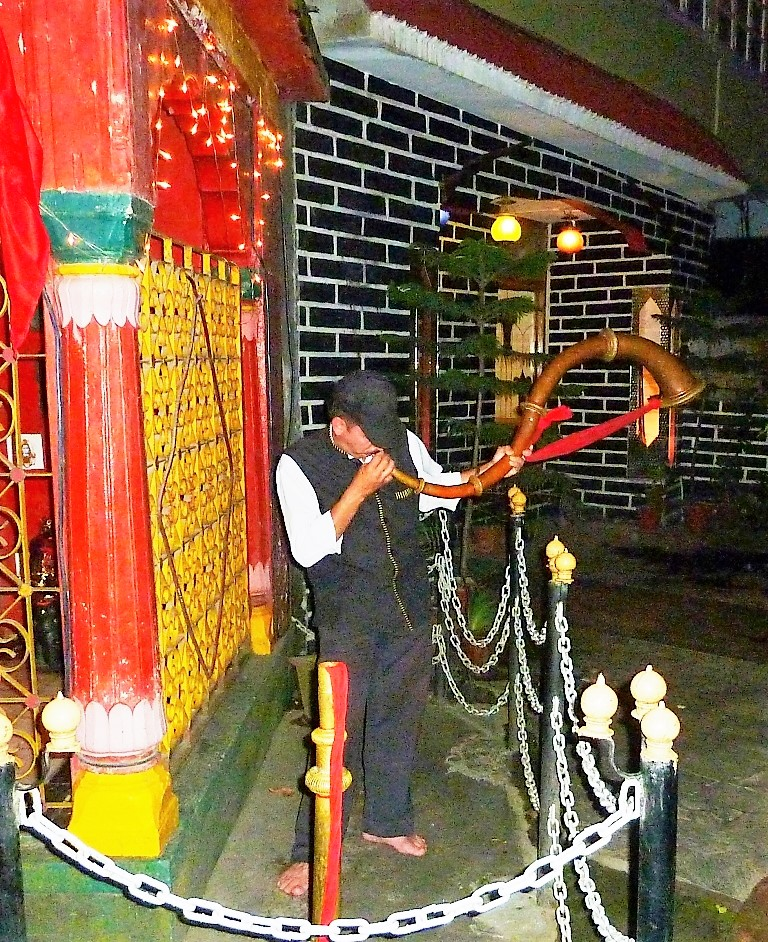
Playing horn at Palace Temple. Mandi, Himachal Pradesh, India

Since the only notes available were those on the harmonic series of one of those pitches, they had no ability to play in different keys. The remedy for this limitation was the use of crooks, i.e., sections of tubing of differing length which, when inserted between the mouthpiece and lead pipe, increased the length of the instrument, and thus lowered its pitch. The earliest surviving crooked horn was made by the Viennese maker Michael Leichamschneider and is dated 1721. However, Leichamschneider is known to have been making crooked horns as early as 1703, when he sold "a pair of great new Jägerhorn" equipped with four double crooks and four tuning bits to the Abbot of Krems. In England, the crooked horn appeared as early as 1704, when it was called corno cromatico or, because of its origin and because it was most often played by German musicians (in particular the Messing family, who popularized the instrument in London beginning around 1730), "German horn". In cases where it was necessary to specify the older, hooped horn without crooks, the English called it the "French horn".

By the second decade of the eighteenth century horns had become regular members of continental orchestras. In 1713 Johann Mattheson stated, "the lovely, majestic hunting horns (Ital. Cornette di Caccia, Gall. Cors de Chasse) have now become very fashionable, in church music just as much as in theatre and chamber music, partly because they are not so coarse as trumpets, but also partly because they can be managed with greater facilité. The most useful have the same ambitus above F as the trumpets have above C. However, they sound more poetic and are more satisfying than the deafening and shrieking clarini ... because they are a perfect fifth lower in pitch."

One performing difficulty raised by the use of crooks inserted at the mouthpiece end of the instrument was that players were obliged to hold the horn in a way that the crooks would not fall out. For the hunting horn played on horseback, the left hand held the reins while the right hand gripped the body of the horn, but with crooks the left hand was required to hold them and the instrument securely together, with the right hand grasping the bell or the body of the instrument. The solution came with the creation of the Inventionshorn in about 1753 by the famous horn player Anton Joseph Hampel in collaboration with the Dresden instrument maker Johann Georg Werner. In this type of instrument, the relationship between the mouthpiece and lead pipe is usually undisturbed and a series of cylindrical-bore sliding crooks are fitted into the central portion of the instrument to lower the pitch from E downwards. These sliding crooks also had the function of tuning slides, obviating the need for tuning "bits" inserted before or after the crook. In order to raise the pitch above F, however, it was necessary to insert a new, shorter lead pipe, acting as a crook. This design was adapted and improved by the Parisian maker Raoux in about 1780, and adopted by many soloists in France. This was called the cor solo, and was distinguished by the use of just five crooks for playing in the most common keys for solo compositions, G, F, E, E♭, and D.

Orchestral horns are traditionally grouped into "high" horn and "low" horn pairs. Players specialize to negotiate the unusually wide range required of the instrument. Formerly, in certain situations, composers called for two pairs of horns in two different keys. For example, a composer might call for two horns in C and two in E♭ for a piece in C minor, in order to gain harmonics of the relative major unavailable on the C horns. Eventually, two pairs of horns became the standard, and from this tradition of two independent pairs, each with its own "high" and "low" horn, came the modern convention of writing both the first and third parts above the second and fourth.

In the mid-18th century, horn players began to insert the right hand into the bell to change the effective length of the instrument, adjusting the tuning up to the distance between two adjacent harmonics depending on how much of the opening was covered. This technique, known as hand-stopping, is generally credited to the self-same Anton Joseph Hampel who created the Inventionshorn. It was first developed around 1750, and was refined and carried to much of Europe by the influential Giovanni Punto. This offered more possibilities for playing notes not on the harmonic series. By the early classical period, the horn had become an instrument capable of much melodic playing. A notable example of this are the four Mozart Horn Concerti and Concert Rondo (K. 412, 417, 477, 495, 371), wherein melodic chromatic tones are used, owing to the growing prevalence of hand-stopping and other newly emerging techniques.

In 1818 rotary valves were introduced by Heinrich Stölzel and Friedrich Blümel (later, in 1839, piston valves were applied to the horn by François Périnet), initially to overcome problems associated with changing crooks during a performance. Valves' unreliability, musical taste, and players' distrust, among other reasons, slowed their adoption into mainstream. Many traditional conservatories and players refused to use them at first, claiming that the valveless horn, or natural horn, was a better instrument. Some musicians, specializing in period instruments, still use a natural horn when playing in original performance styles, seeking to recapture the sound and tenor in which an older piece was written.

The use of valves, however, opened up a great deal more flexibility in playing in different keys; in effect, the horn became an entirely different instrument, fully chromatic for the first time. Valves were originally used primarily as a means to play in different keys without crooks, not for harmonic playing. That is reflected in compositions for horns, which only began to include chromatic passages in the late 19th century. When valves were invented, generally, the French made narrower-bored horns with piston valves and the Germans made larger-bored horns with rotary valves.

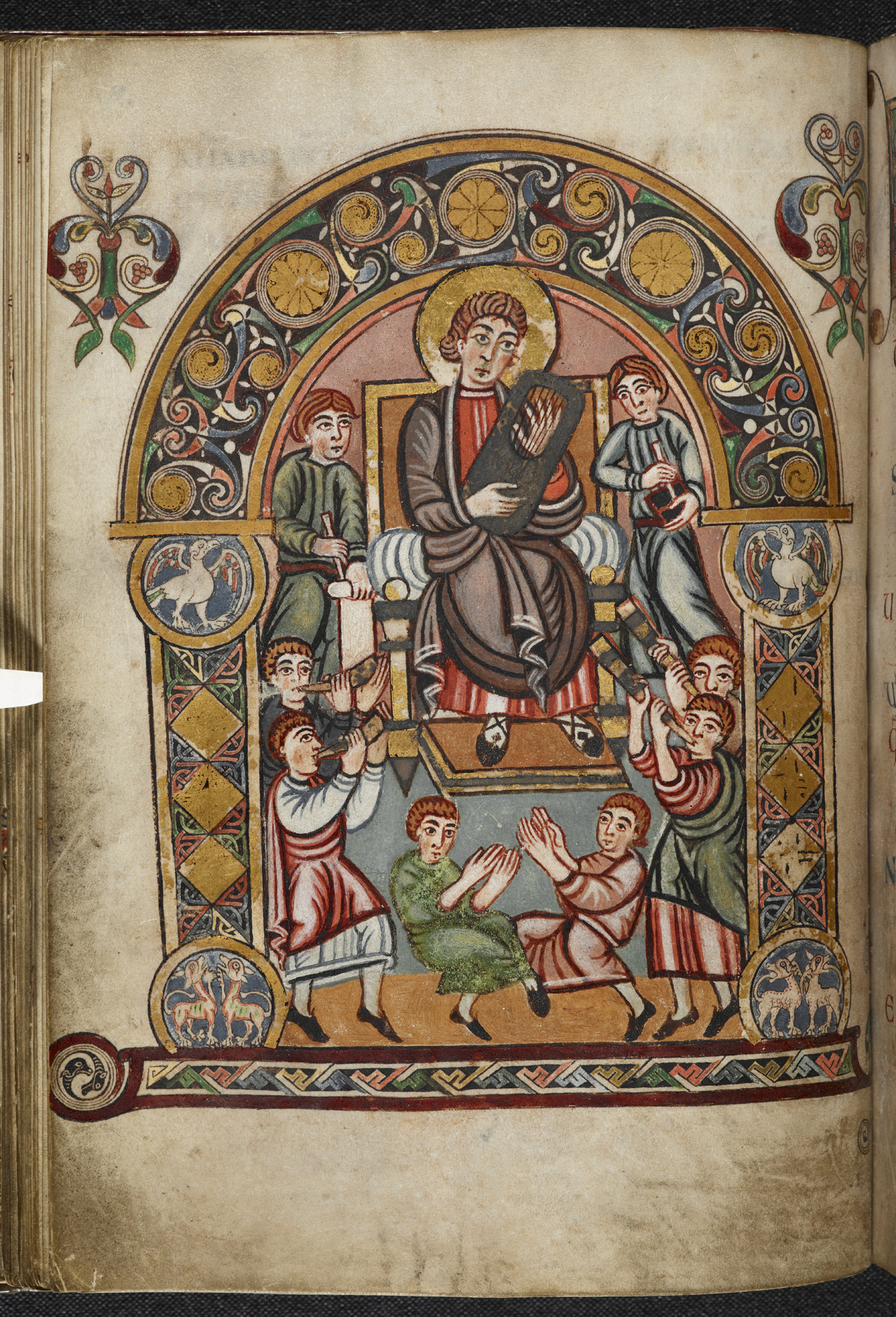
8th century A.D., England, Vespasian Psalter. Hunting horns played with trumpets and lyre. Palms of players covering ends of horns to change the notes.

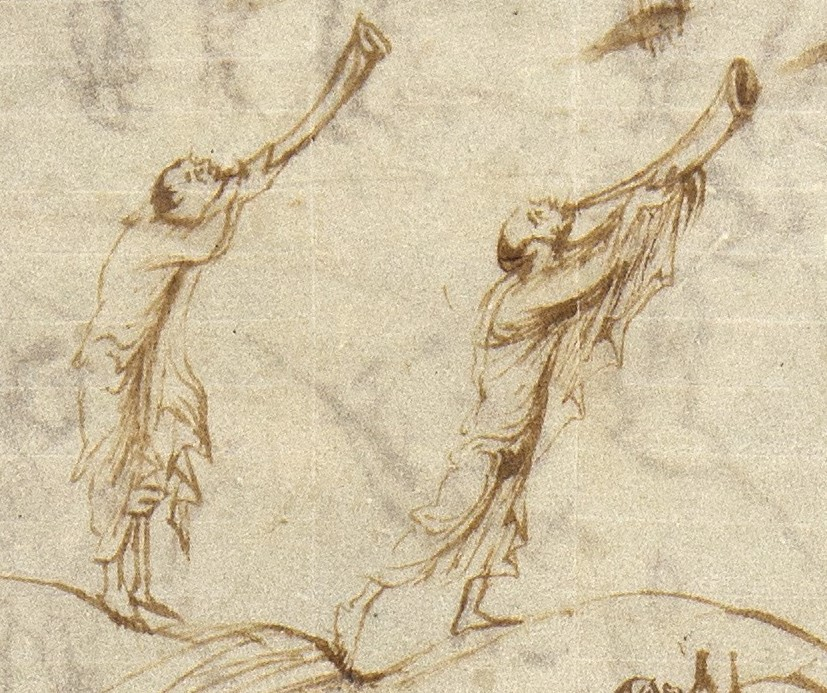
850 A.D. Utrecht Psalter, France. Horns being played to God (in the full image God is sitting above, looking down).

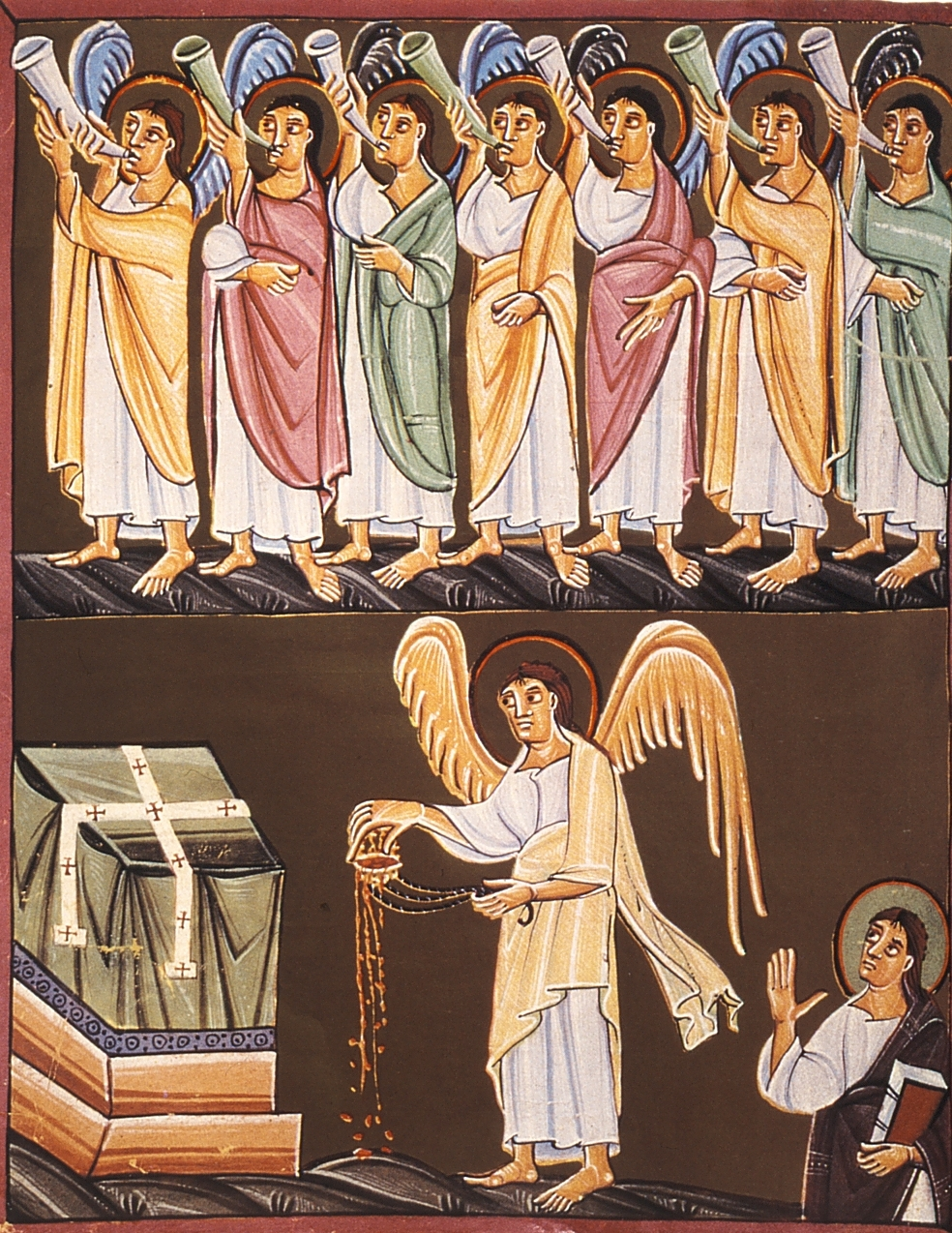
1000 A.D., Bamberg Apocalypse, Germany. Angels with horns at the Apocalypse.

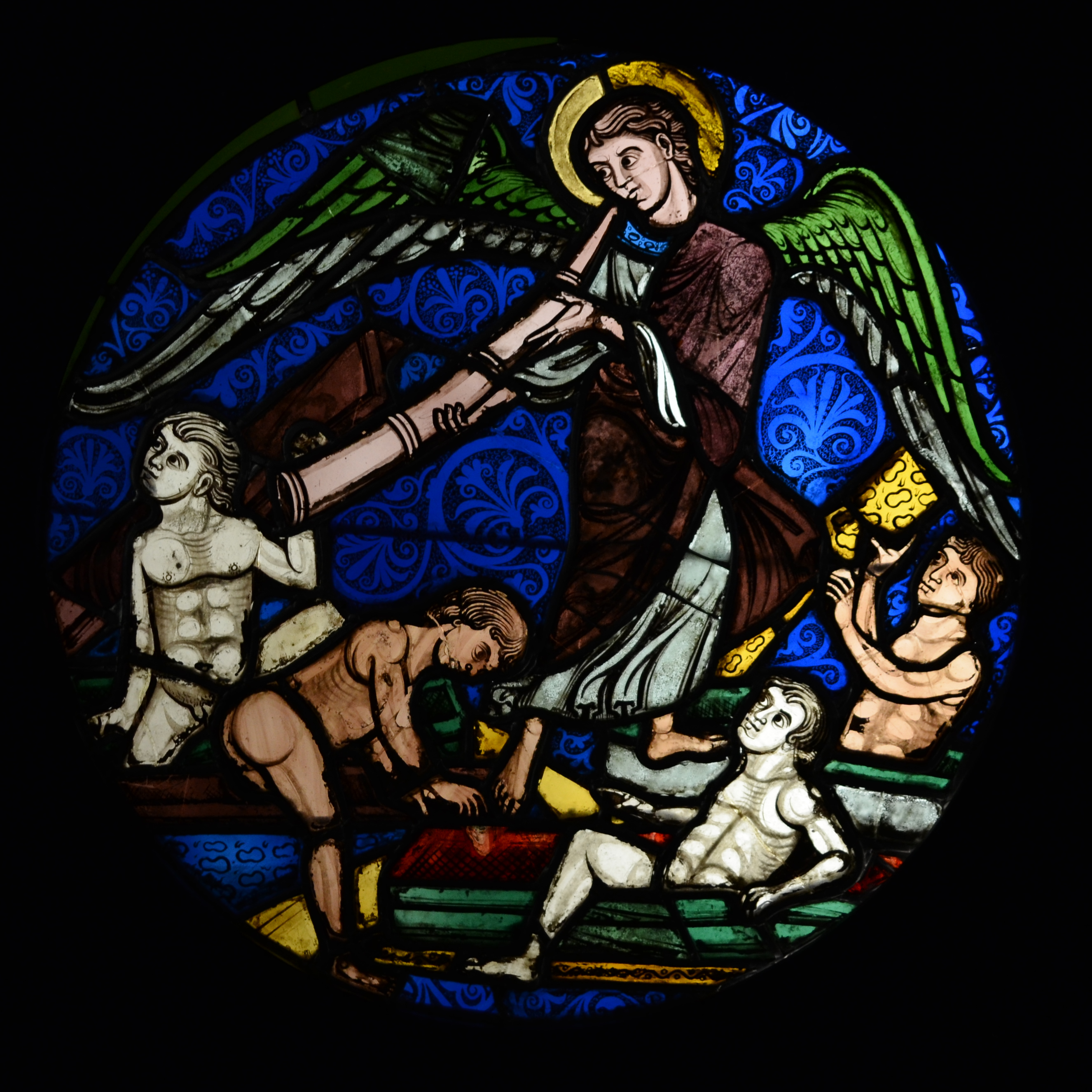
Circa 1248, France. Trumpet made in sections.

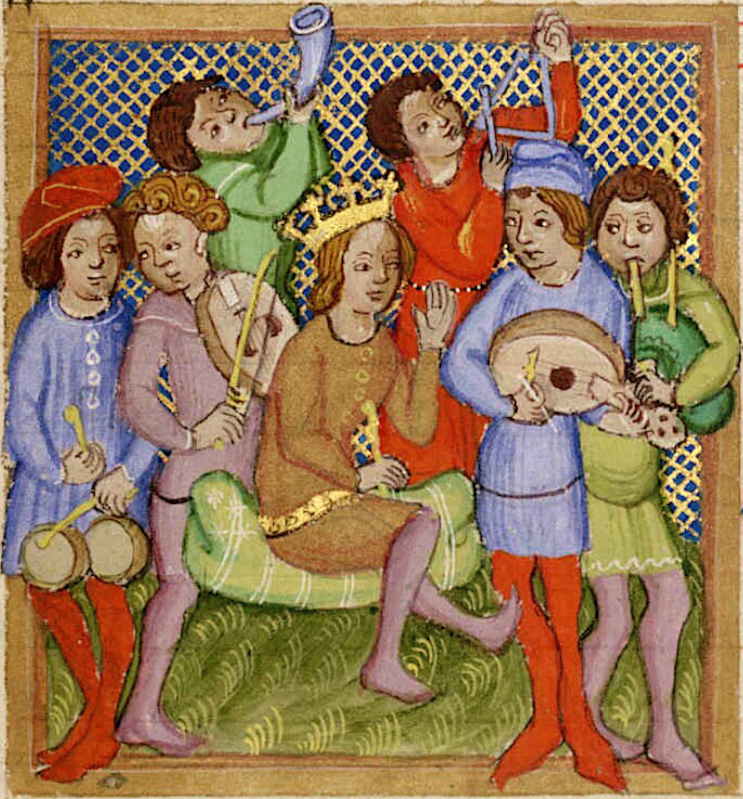
1417, Czechoslovakia. Hunting horn played in troubadour band before King David.

== Variety ==
The variety in horn history includes fingerhole horns, the natural horn, Russian horns, French horn, Vienna horn, mellophone, marching horn, and Wagner tuba.

=== Fingerhole horns ===
Animal horns adapted as signalling instruments were used from prehistoric times. Archaeologists have discovered cow horns with fingerholes drilled in the side (providing a more complete musical scale) dating from the Iron Age. This type of rustic instrument is found down to the present day all over the Baltic region of Europe, and in some parts of Africa. In Scandinavia it is known by many names: björnhorn, bukkehorn, fingerhorn, lekhorn, låthorn, prillarhorn, soittotorvi, spelhorn, tjuthorn, tuthorn, vallhorn, and many others. In Estonia it is called sokusarv and by the Bongo people mangval. Descriptions in French are found from the thirteenth to the fifteenth centuries of instruments called coradoiz (= modern French cor à doigts), which are precursors of the cornett.

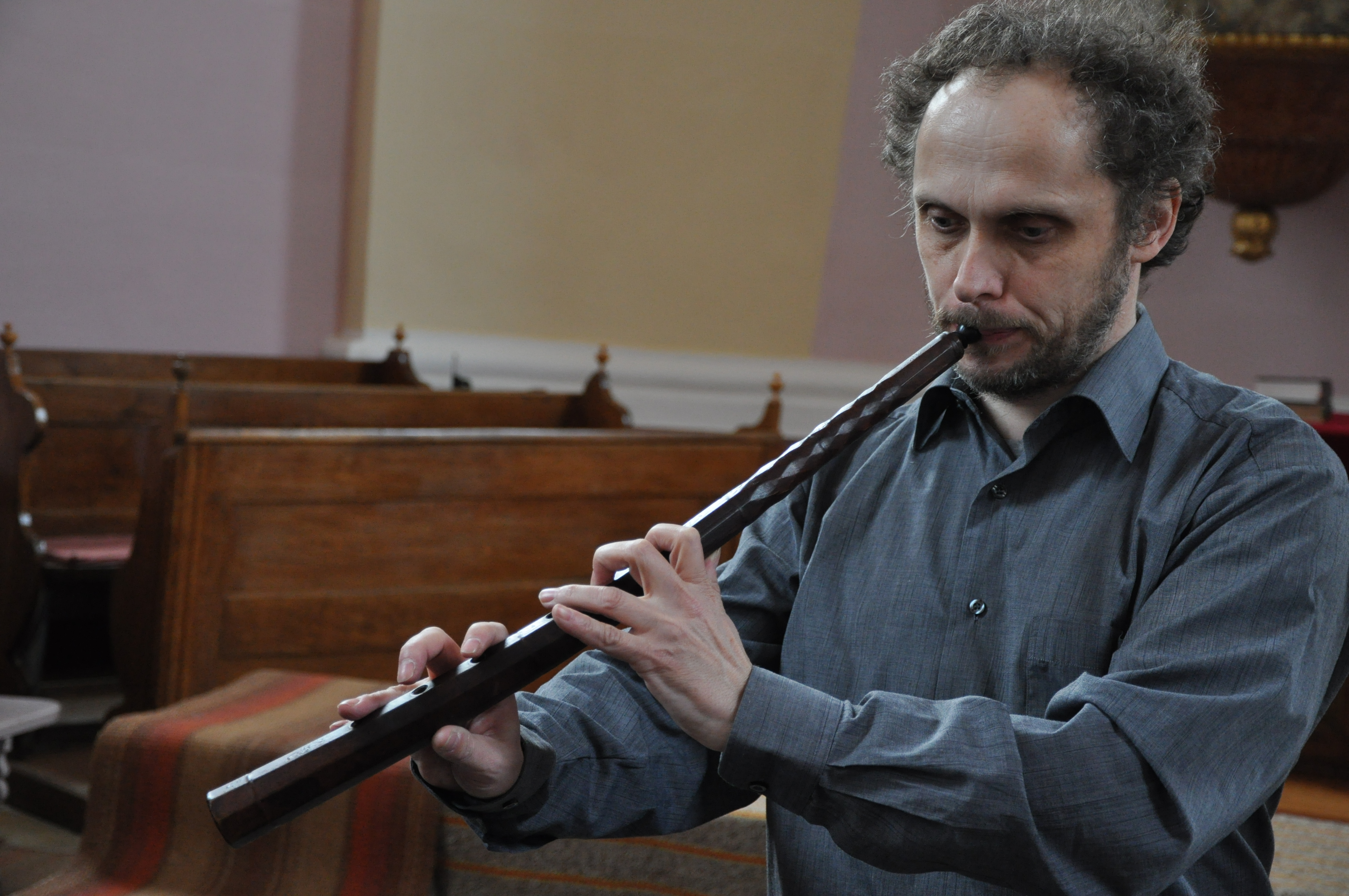
Cornett

The cornett, which became one of the most popular wind instruments of the Renaissance and early Baroque periods, was developed from the fingerhole-horn idea. In its most common form it was a gently curved instrument, carved in two halves from wood. The pieces were then glued together and wrapped in black leather (hence the term "black cornett"), and a detachable mouthpiece added. Another variant, called the "mute cornett", was turned from a single piece of wood with the mouthpiece an integral part of the instrument. Because the types of wood used were usually light in colour, these were sometimes referred to as "white cornetts". Amongst the earliest representations of the cornett, showing its characteristic octagonal exterior, is a carving in Lincoln Cathedral from about 1260, which shows an angel apparently playing two cornetti at once. The earliest use of the name in English is in Le Morte d'Arthur from about 1400 where, as in most subsequent sources it is spelled with a single T: "cornet". The spelling with two Ts is a modern convention, to avoid confusion with the nineteenth-century valved brass instrument of that name, though in Old French the spelling cornette is found. The name is a diminutive derived the Latin cornu, "horn".

In the sixteenth century still larger versions of the cornett were devised. In order to put the fingerholes within reach of the human hand, these bass instruments required so many curves they acquired the name "serpent". Toward the end of the eighteenth century various attempts were made to improve the serpent. An upright version, built on the pattern of the bassoon and made sometimes of wood, sometimes of metal, sometimes a combination of the two, were called "bass horn" or "Russian bassoon". In the nineteenth century, an all-metal version with larger tone holes closed by keywork was called an ophicleide (from the Greek ophis (ὄφις) "serpent" + kleis (κλείς) "key" = "keyed serpent"). The ophicleide only remained in use until the middle of the nineteenth century when it was eclipsed by the superior valved brass instruments.

=== Natural horn ===
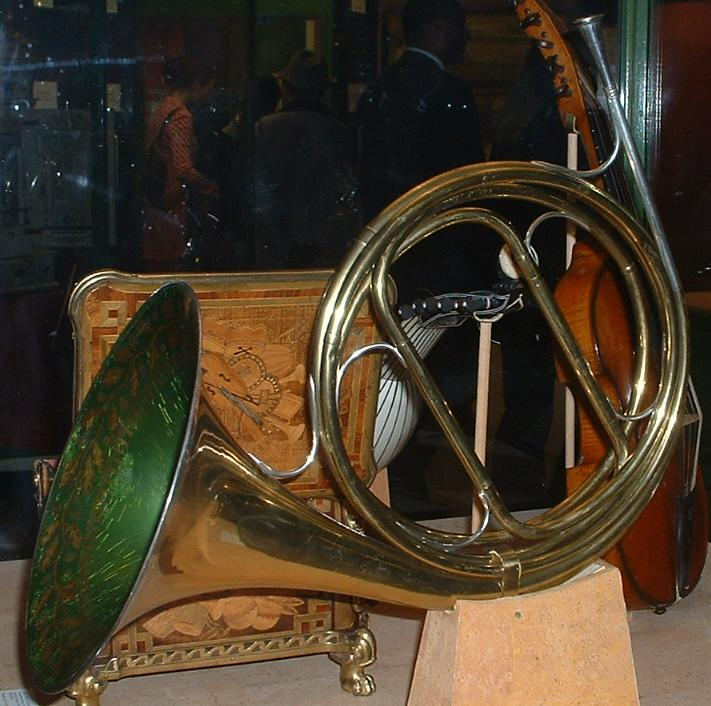
A natural horn has no valves, but can be tuned to a different key by inserting different tubing, as during a rest period.

Natural horns include a variety of valveless, keyless instruments such as bugles, posthorns, and hunting horns of many different shapes. One type of hunting horn, with relatively long tubing bent into a single hoop (or sometimes a double hoop), is the ancestor of the modern orchestral and band horns. Beginning in the early 18th century, the player could change key by adding crooks to change the length of tubing. It is essentially a hunting horn, with its pitch controlled by air speed, aperture (opening of the lips through which air passes) and the use of the right hand moving in and out of the bell. Today it is played as a period instrument. The natural horn can only play from a single harmonic series at a time because there is only one length of tubing available to the horn player. A proficient player can indeed alter the pitch by partially muting the bell with the right hand, thus enabling the player to reach some notes that are not part of the instrument's natural harmonic series—of course this technique also affects the quality of the tone.

=== Russian horns ===
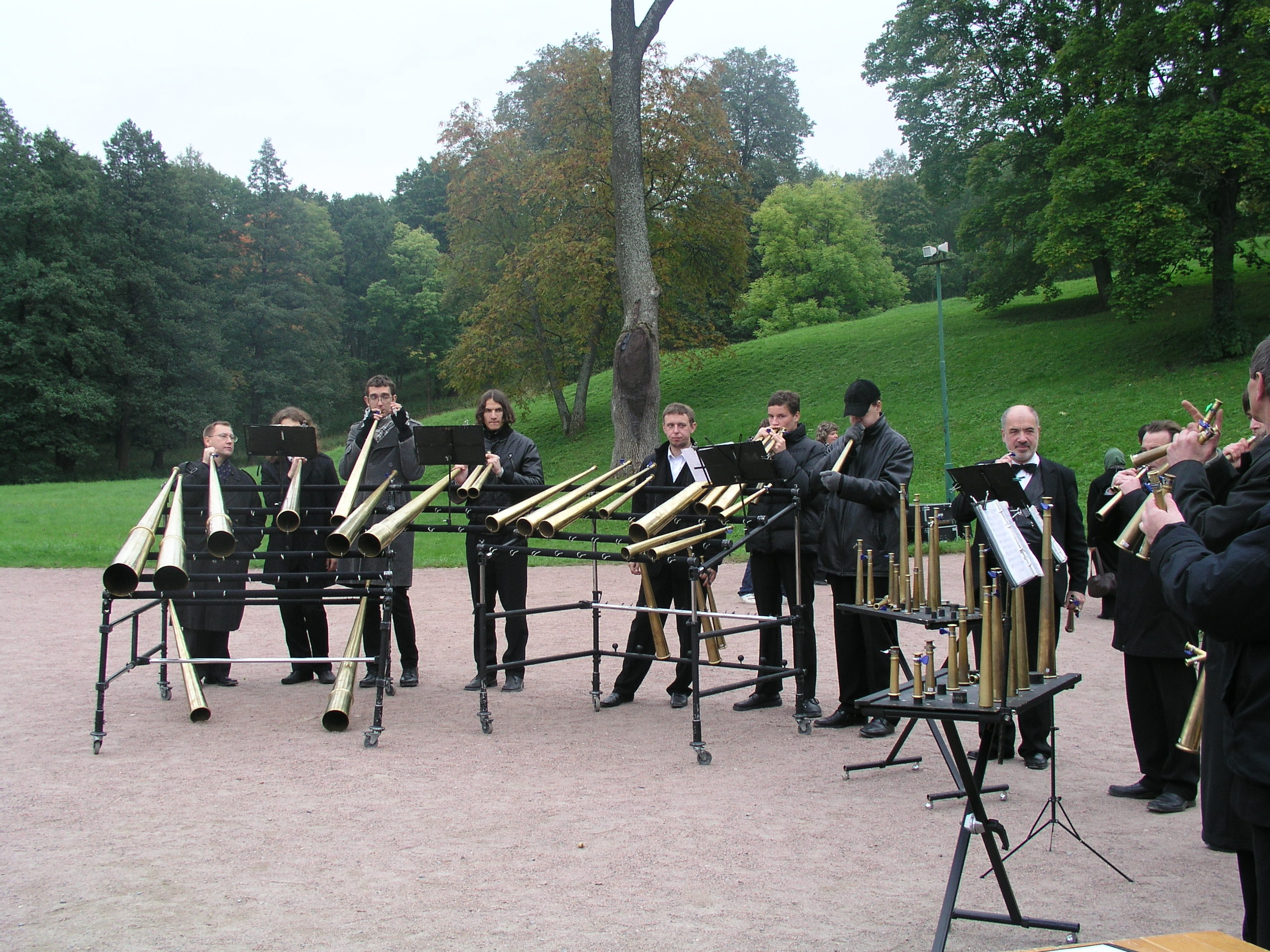
St Petersburg Russian horn band in 2008

In 1751, Prince Narishkin, Master of the Hunt to Empress Elizabeth of Russia, had a set of sixteen carefully tuned metal horns made to ensure that his huntsmen would sound a harmonious D-major chord while signalling to each other. He then got the idea of enlisting a Bohemian horn-player, J. A. Mareš, who was in service with the Imperial court in St. Petersburg, to organize these new horns into a band. Maresch had made a second set of thirty-two (or perhaps thirty-seven) horns, each capable of playing a different, single note—the second harmonic of the instrument—from a C-major scale covering several octaves. (Later the size of the band was increased to sixty horns encompassing five octaves.) The instruments were straight or slightly curved horns made of copper or brass, had a wide conical bore, and were played with a cupped trumpet-type mouthpiece. A metal cap fixed to the bell end was used to adjust the tuning. Each man in the band was trained to play his note in turn, similar to the way in which a group of handbell ringers perform melodies by each sounding their bells at a predetermined moment. This horn band, effectively a giant human music-box of the sort only feasible in a slave culture, played its first public concert in 1753 or 1755 and debuted officially at the Grand Hunt concert in 1757, creating a fashion that spread outside of Russia and continued for eighty years. With proper training, such a horn ensemble was capable of playing relatively complex music in full harmony. The Russian nobility developed a taste for horn bands, which were sometimes sold as a body—the performers along with horns—since most of the players were serfs. Some bands toured Europe and the British Isles, playing arrangements of standard concert repertory and Russian folk music, as well as original compositions. Although received with praise for their accomplishment, they were also criticized for "reducing man to the level of a machine". In Eastern Germany, workmen's bands modified the technique of these horns by adding the upper octave to each instrument's note, and the use of hand-stopping for the smaller horns to add one or two lower semitones.

=== German horn ===
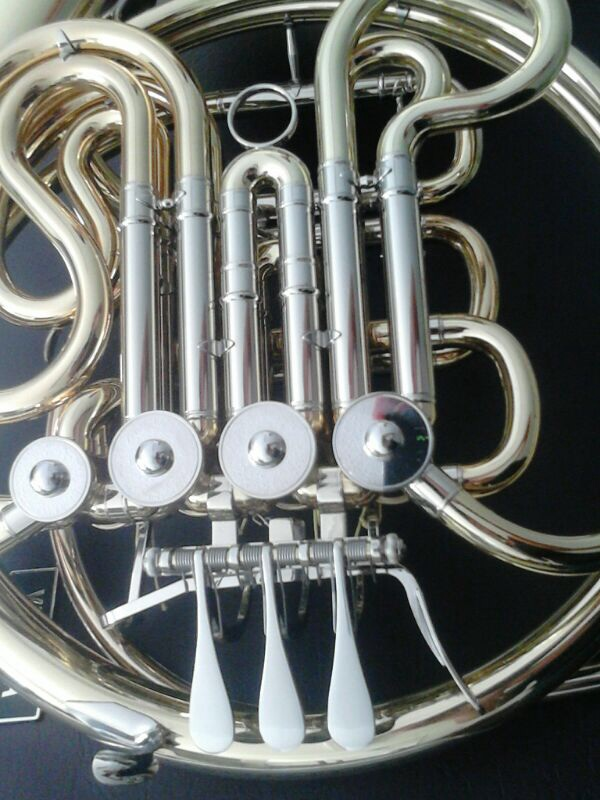
Rotary valves characteristic of the German double horn

The German horn is the most common type of orchestral horn, and is ordinarily known simply as the "horn". The double horn in F/B♭ is the version most used by professional bands and orchestras. A musician who plays the German horn is called a horn player (or, less frequently, a hornist). Pitch is controlled through the adjustment of lip tension in the mouthpiece and the operation of valves by the left hand, which route the air into extra tubing. German horns have lever-operated rotary valves. The backward-facing orientation of the bell relates to the perceived desirability to create a subdued sound, in concert situations, in contrast to the more-piercing quality of the trumpet.

Three valves control the flow of air in the single horn, which is tuned to F or less commonly B♭. The more common "double horn" is found almost exclusively in the German design, only rarely in the French horn, and never in the Vienna horn. It has a fourth valve, usually operated by the thumb, which routes the air to one set of tubing tuned to F or another tuned to B♭. Although first developed by Paxman, a British firm, triple horns with five valves are also of the German-horn type, tuned in F, B♭, and a descant E♭ or F. Also common are descant doubles, which typically provide B♭ and alto-F branches. This configuration provides a high-range horn while avoiding the additional complexity and weight of a triple.

=== French horn ===
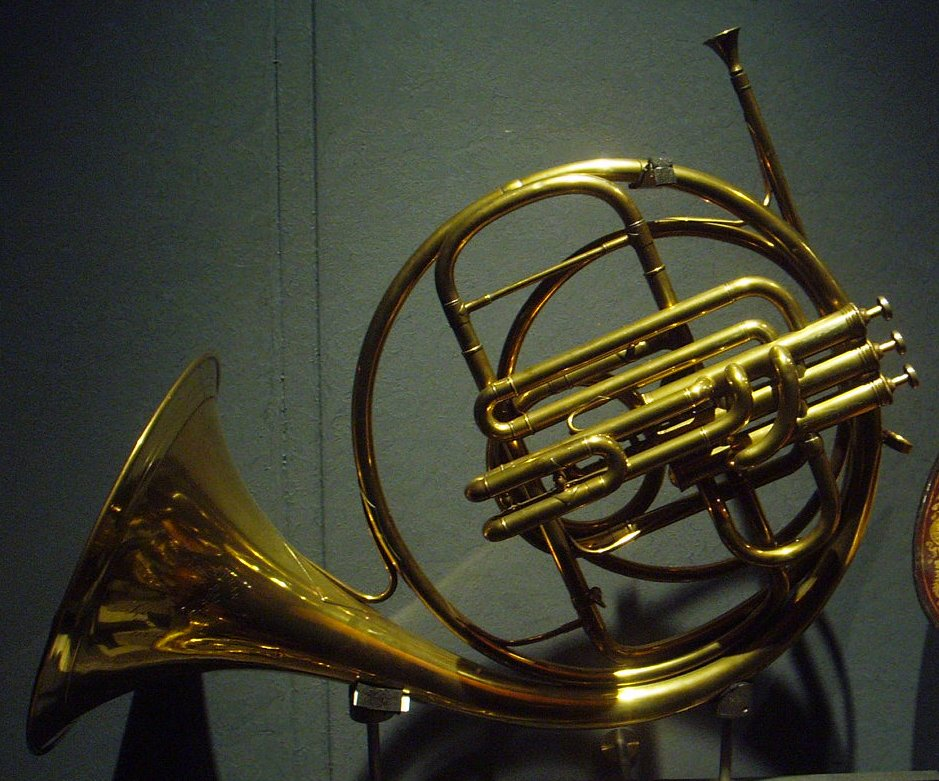
French horn by Jean Baptiste Arban, with three Périnet valves

The bore of the French horn is small, between 10.8 and 11 mm, compared to 11.5 mm for the German horn, but not as small as the Vienna horn at 10.7 mm. These narrow-bore French instruments are equipped with piston valves (also called Périnet valves, after their inventor), unlike today's more usual orchestral (German) horns, which have rotary valves. A musician who plays the French horn, like the players of the German and Vienna horns (confusingly also sometimes called French horns), is also called a horn player (or less frequently, a hornist).

Three valves control the flow of air in the single horn, which is tuned to F or less commonly B♭. Although double French horns do exist, they are rare.

A crucial element in playing the horn deals with the mouthpiece. Most of the time, the mouthpiece is placed in the exact center of the lips, but, because of differences in the formation of the lips and teeth of different players, some tend to play with the mouthpiece slightly off center. Although the exact side-to-side placement of the mouthpiece varies for most horn players, the up-and-down placement of the mouthpiece is generally two-thirds on the upper lip and one-third on the lower lip. Usually, in order to play higher octave notes, the pressure exerted on the lips from the mouthpiece is increased. But, although some pressure is needed, excessive pressure is not desirable. Playing with excessive pressure makes the playing of the horn sound forced and harsh as well as decreases endurance of the player by about half.

=== Vienna horn ===
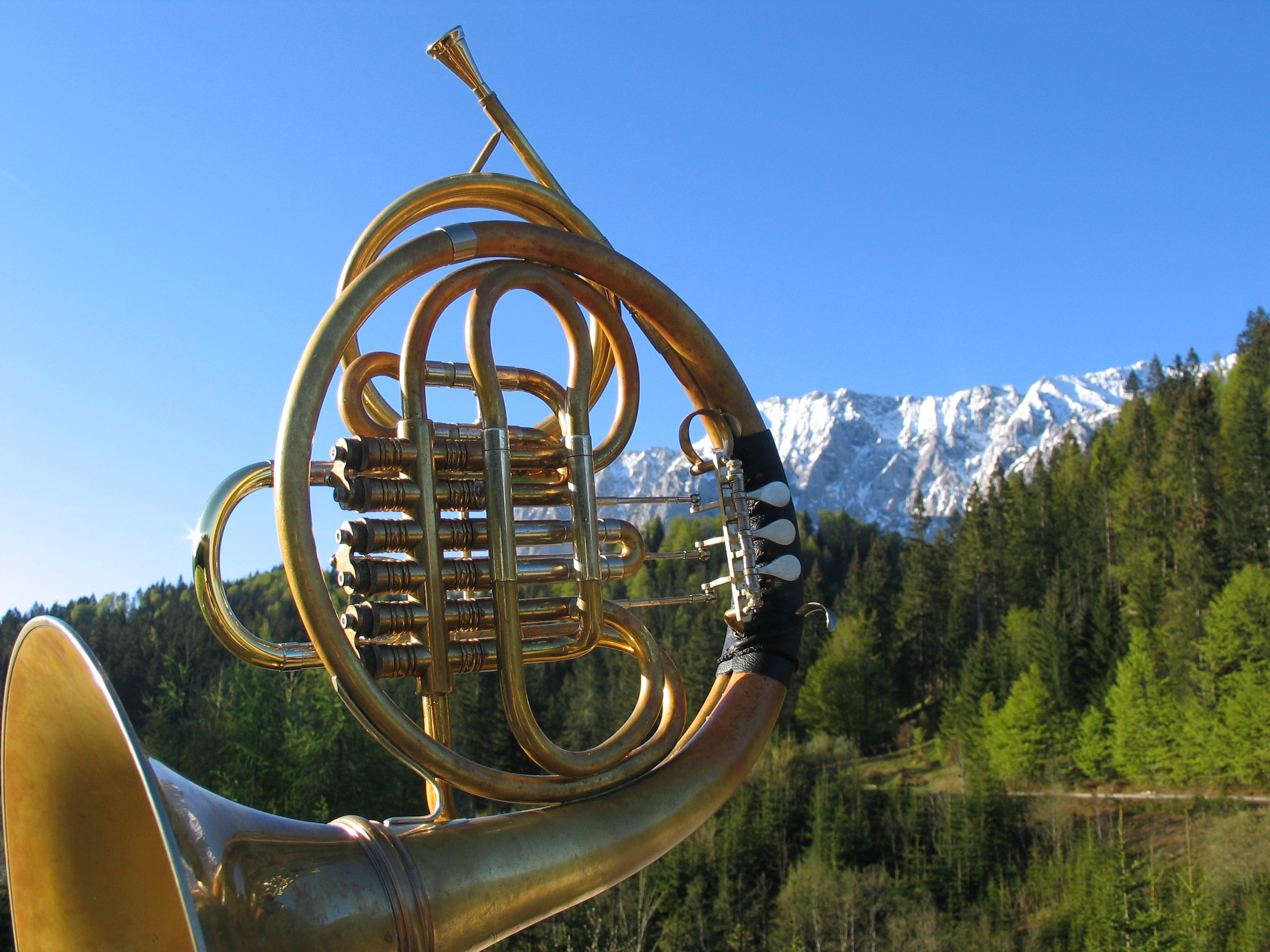
Vienna horn

The Vienna horn is a special horn used primarily in Vienna, Austria. Instead of using rotary valves or piston valves, it uses the Pumpenvalve (or Vienna Valve), which is a double-piston operating inside the valve slides, and usually situated on the opposite side of the corpus from the player's left hand, and operated by a long pushrod. Unlike the modern horn, which has grown considerably larger internally (for a bigger, broader, and louder tone), and considerably heavier (with the addition of valves and tubing in the case of the double horn) the Vienna horn very closely mimics the size and weight of the natural horn (although the valves do add some weight, they are lighter than rotary valves), even using crooks in the front of the horn, between the mouthpiece and the instrument. Although instead of the full range of keys, Vienna horn players usually use an F crook and it is looked down upon to use others, though switching to an A or B♭ crook for higher pitched music does happen on occasion. Vienna horns are often used with funnel shaped mouthpieces similar to those used on the natural horn, with very little (if any) backbore and a very thin rim. The Viennese horn requires very specialized technique and can be quite challenging to play, even for accomplished players of modern horns. The Vienna horn has a warmer, softer sound than the modern horn. Its pumpen-valves facilitate a continuous transition between notes (glissando); conversely, a more precise operating of the valves is required to avoid notes that sound out of tune.

=== Mellophone ===
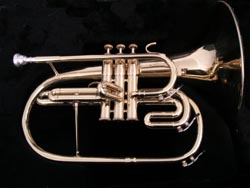
A mellophone

Two instruments are called a mellophone. The first is an instrument shaped somewhat like a horn, in that it is formed in a circle. It has piston valves and is played with the right hand on the valves. Manufacturing of this instrument sharply decreased in the middle of the twentieth century, and this mellophone (or mellophonium) rarely appears today.

The second instrument is used in modern brass bands and marching bands, and is more accurately called a "marching mellophone" or mellophone. A derivative of the F alto horn, it is keyed in F. It is shaped like a flugelhorn, with piston valves played with the right hand and a forward-pointing bell. These horns are generally considered better marching instruments than regular horns because their position is more stable on the mouth, they project better, and they weigh less. It is primarily used as the middle voice of drum and bugle corps. Though they are usually played with a V-cup cornet-like mouthpiece, their range overlaps the common playing range of the horn. This mouthpiece switch makes the mellophone louder, less mellow, and more brassy and brilliant, making it more appropriate for marching bands.

As they are pitched in F or G and their range overlaps that of the horn, mellophones can be used in place of the horn in brass and marching band settings. Mellophones are, however, sometimes unpopular with horn players because the mouthpiece change can be difficult and requires a different embouchure. Mouthpiece adapters are available so that a horn mouthpiece can fit into the mellophone lead pipe, but this does not compensate for the many differences that a horn player must adapt to. The bore is generally cylindrical as opposed to the more conical horn; thus, the "feel" of the mellophone can be foreign to a horn player. Another unfamiliar aspect of the mellophone is that it is designed to be played with the right hand instead of the left (although it can be played with the left).

While horn players may be asked to play the mellophone, it is unlikely that the instrument was ever intended as a substitute for the horn, mainly because of the fundamental differences described. As an instrument it compromises between the ability to sound like a horn, while being used like a trumpet or flugelhorn, a tradeoff that sacrifices acoustic properties for ergonomics.

=== Marching horn ===
The marching horn is quite similar to the mellophone in shape and appearance, but is pitched in the key of B♭ (the same as the B♭ side of a regular double horn). It is also available in F alto (one octave above the F side of a regular double horn). The marching horn is also normally played with a horn mouthpiece (unlike the mellophone, which needs an adapter to fit the horn mouthpiece). These instruments are primarily used in marching bands so that the sound comes from a forward-facing bell, as dissipation of the sound from the backward-facing bell becomes a concern in open-air environments. Many college marching bands and drum corps, however, use mellophones instead, which, with many marching bands, better balance the tone of the other brass instruments; additionally, mellophones require less special training of trumpet players, who considerably outnumber horn players.

=== Saxhorns ===
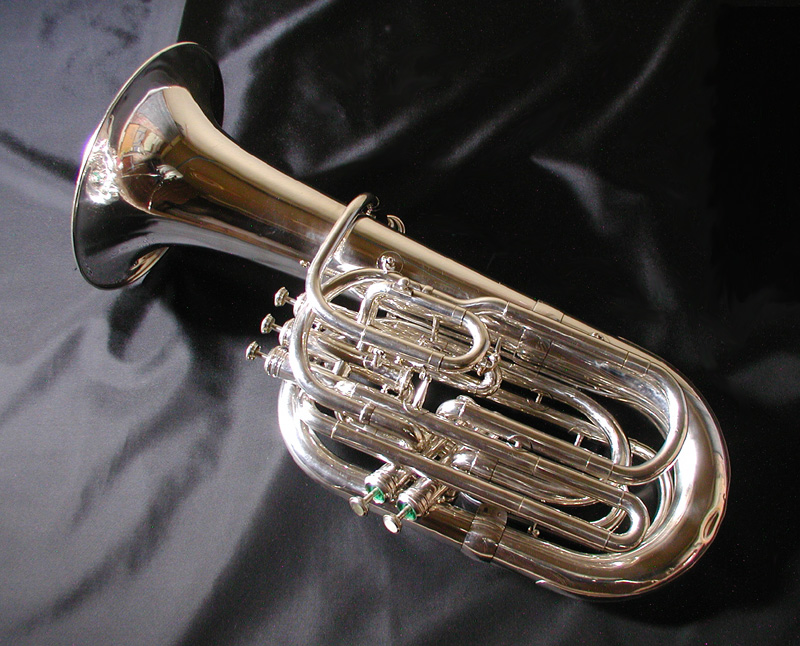
Bass saxhorn in B♭

The saxhorns constitute a family of brass instruments with tapered bores. Pitched in eight alternating sizes in E♭ and B♭, like saxophones, they were originally designed for army use and revolutionized military and brass bands in Europe and America. Developed during the 1840s and 50s, the saxhorn was first patented in Paris in 1845 by Adolphe Sax, though the validity of his patents was challenged by rival instrument makers during his lifetime. Throughout the mid-1850s, he continued to experiment with the instrument's valve pattern. Later makers, particularly in America, altered the scale and designs sometimes to such an extent as to make it difficult to determine whether the larger sizes of the resulting instruments actually have descended from the saxhorn or the tuba. The tenor and baritone horns, amongst other sizes of instruments used in British brass bands, are members of the saxhorn family.

=== Wagner tuba ===
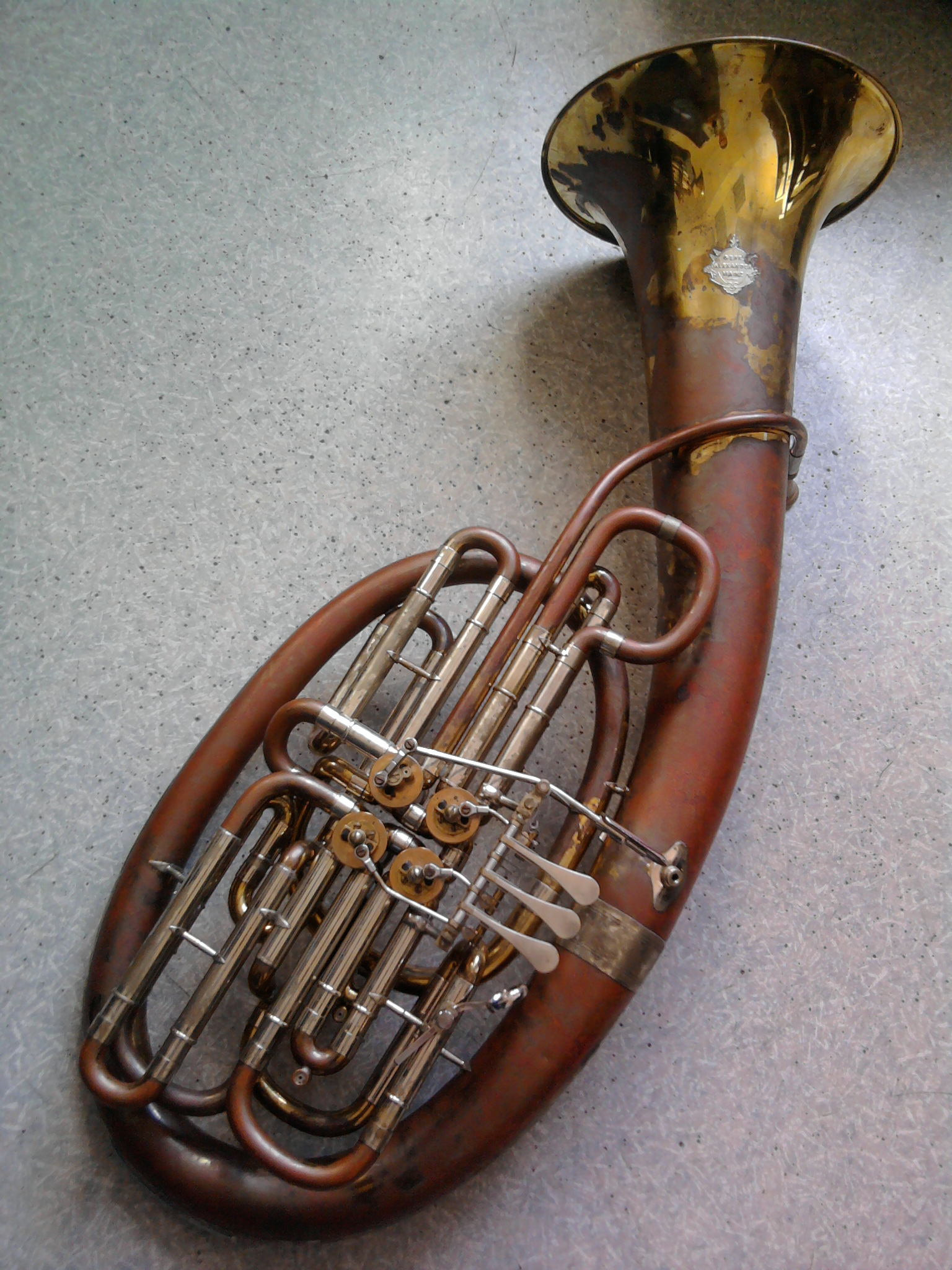
A Wagner tuba

The Wagner tuba is a rare brass instrument that is essentially a horn modified to have a larger bell throat and a vertical bell. Despite its name, it is generally not considered part of the tuba family. Invented for Richard Wagner specifically for his work Der Ring des Nibelungen, it has since been written for by various other composers, including Bruckner, Stravinsky and Richard Strauss. It uses a horn mouthpiece and is available as a single tuba in B♭ or F, or, more recently, as a double tuba similar to the double horn. Its common range is similar to that of the euphonium, but its possible range is the same as that of the horn, extending from low F♯, below the bass clef staff to high C above the treble staff when read in F. These low pedals are substantially easier to play on the Wagner tuba than on the horn.

== Repertory ==
=== Early history ===
Amongst the first written records of horn music are hunting-horn signals, which date back to the fourteenth century. The earliest of these is The Art of Hunting (1327) by William Twiti, who uses syllables such as "moot", "trout", and "trourourout" to describe a number of calls involved in various stages of the hunt. Hardouin de Fontaines-Guerin's treatise Le Livre du Trésor de vénerie (1394) includes fourteen hunting-horn signals using a notation specially designed to the purpose, consisting of a series of black and white squares. Although Dame Juliana Berners's Boke of Saint Albans (c. 1345)—also known as the Book of Hawkinge, Hunting and Fysshing—is cited as an even earlier source of notated horn calls, the copy containing them actually dates from the sixteenth century. As in Hardouin's treatise, the notation of the calls is in a specially designed tablature. The first occurrence of horn calls in standard musical notation is in the hunting treatise La vénerie by Jacques du Fouilloux, dated variously as 1561 and 1573, followed soon after in an English translation by George Gascoigne (often misattributed to George Turberville) titled The Noble Art of Venerie or Hvnting (1575). Jacques du Fouilloux notates the calls on a single pitch, C_{4}, whereas Gascoigne presents them on D_{4}. Although it is generally accepted that the horns used on the hunt at this early date were only capable of a single note, or at best a striking of the pitch well below and "whooping up to the true pitch", the objection has been raised against a literal, monotonic interpretation of the notation on grounds that many of the calls would be indistinguishable one from another, whereas the hunt participants would need each call to be distinctive, even if we have no direct evidence of melodic variation.

Apart from hunting calls, there is no surviving music from before the seventeenth century that specifies use of the horn. However, there are some allusions to horn calls in vocal and keyboard music. In the late fourteenth century, Italian caccie (a word meaning both "canon" and "hunt", and cognate with English "chase") sometimes use lively figures on two notes a fourth apart, such as Gherardello da Firenze's Tosto che l'alba, after the words "suo corno sonava" (sounded his horn). A less certain association is found in the same alternation of two notes a fourth apart in John Bull's The King's Hunt in the Fitzwilliam Virginal Book, copied at the beginning of the seventeenth century.

The increased tube length of the cor à plusieurs tours in the late sixteenth century and with the trompe de chasse in the middle of the seventeenth, a larger number of pitches became available for horn calls, and these calls are imitated in programme music from the second quarter of the seventeenth century onward, though scored not for actual horns but for strings only. An early example is found in the "Chiamata a la caccia" in Francesco Cavalli's opera Le nozze di Teti e di Peleo (1639). A few years later, Jean-Baptiste Lully used horn calls in a five-part piece for strings called "Le cors de chasse" in the comédie-ballet La Princesse d'Élide, itself part of the extravagant entertainment titled Les plaisirs de l'île enchantée (1664). According to another opinion, Lully actually meant the scoring of the "Air des valets des chiens et des chasseurs avec Cors de chasse" to include trompes de chasse, making this the first use of the new instrument in a musical composition, as opposed to hunting signals. An engraving by Israël Silvestre, published c. 1676, portrays a scene from Lully's work, and is probably the earliest iconographic representation of the hooped horn.

Soon afterward the hooped trompe de chasse began appearing in ballet and opera orchestras in the Empire and German states. The intrada of a ballet by Johann Heinrich Schmelzer, performed in Linz on 15 November 1680, was played by violins and hunting horns together, according to the libretto (the music does not survive). Georg Bronner's opera Echo und Narcissus (1693) and Agostino Steffani's opera I trionfi del fato (produced in 1695 in Hanover) also used horns. At about this same time the horn began to appear as a solo instrument. An anonymous Sonata da caccia con un cornu from before 1680 found in a manuscript in Kroměříž sets a cor à plusieurs tours against two violins, two violas, and basso continuo, and a Sonata venatoria from 1684 by Pavel Josef Vejvanovský calls for two trombae breves, which probably also means spiral horns, though hooped horns are not out of the question. A particularly significant composition is a Concerto à 4 in B♭ by Johann Beer, for corne de chasse, posthorn, two violins, and basso continuo; Beer died in a hunting accident in 1700. His concerto not only combines two different kinds of horn, but the corne de chasse part is the earliest solo example of a horn in F (sounding a fifth lower than written), which came to be the "classical" size of the instrument. The F horn appears again soon afterward in an aria from Carlo Agostino Badia's opera Diana rappacificata (Vienna, 1700), where two horns play typical triple-time fanfares. By 1705 the horn was also being used in church music, for example by Dieterich Buxtehude In Lübeck, who in that year called for horns in his cantata Templum honoris.

The horn did not officially enter the Imperial court orchestra in Vienna until 1712, but from there it quickly migrated to the Neapolitan viceroyalty, dominated at that time by the Austrians. In the works of Alessandro Scarlatti and Antonio Lotti, the horn was quickly adopted into Neapolitan opera, the most fashionable in Europe at the time. It was in the hands of these Italian composers that the horn took on its characteristic "harmonic" orchestral role. One of the first Neapolitan works to use horns was Scarlatti's serenata Il genio austriaco: Il Sole, Flora, Zefiro, Partenope e Sebeto, performed 28 August 1713 as part of the celebrations for the birthday of Empress Elizabeth Christina. On 19 November of the same year, Lotti's opera Porsenna was performed at the Teatro S Bartolomeo in a version "adapted and directed" by Scarlatti, and in almost all of his own subsequent operas Scarlatti used horns in the orchestra. The usual name for the horn in these Neapolitan scores was tromba da caccia, an Italianization of the French trompe de chasse. It is thought that the trombon da caccia called for by Vivaldi in his opera Orlando finto pazzo (1714), and his Concerto in F for violin, two trombon da caccia, two oboes, and bassoon, RV574, was also a hooped horn.

=== Solo repertory ===
In the eighteenth century some outstanding concertos were written for solo horn and orchestra by Telemann, Christoph Förster, Michael and Joseph Haydn, Leopold and Wolfgang Amadeus Mozart, and Carl Stamitz. Concerti grossi include concertos for two horns by Vivaldi and Bach's First Brandenburg Concerto. At the end of the century Beethoven composed a Sonata for Horn and Piano in F major, Op. 17, for the Bohemian virtuoso Giovanni Punto (Jan Václav Stich), a master of hand-horn technique.

In the early nineteenth century, Carl Maria von Weber, in addition to giving the horn a prominent orchestral place in the overtures to the operas Oberon and Der Freischütz, composed a spectacularly difficult Concertino in E Minor which, amongst other things, includes an early use of multiphonics, produced by humming into the instrument while playing. Gioachino Rossini exploited the instrument's association with hunting in a piece called Rendez-vous de chasse for four corni da caccia and orchestra (1828). All of these works were written for the natural horn.

The advent of the valved horn brought new possibilities, which were exploited by Robert Schumann in two works written in 1849: the Adagio and Allegro for horn and piano Op. 70 and the Concertstück for four horns and orchestra. Other important works from this era are the concertos by Saverio Mercadante, Franz Strauss, and the First Concerto (1882–83) by his son Richard Strauss. Camille Saint-Saëns did not write a concerto as such, but did compose two Romances for horn (or cello) and orchestra, Op. 67 in E major (1866), and Op. 36 in F major (1874), and a Morceau de concert Op. 94 (1887) for horn and orchestra.

=== Chamber music ===
The horn is a standard member of the wind quintet and brass quintet, and often appears in other configurations. Notable works from the late-eighteenth and early nineteenth centuries include two quintets by Mozart, one in E♭ major for horn, violin, two violas, and cello (KV407/386c) and the other for piano, oboe, clarinet, bassoon and horn (KV452). Beethoven also wrote a Quintet for piano and winds, Op. 16, as well as a Sextet for two horns and strings, Op. 81b, and a Septet in E♭ major, Op. 20, for clarinet, horn, bassoon, violin, viola, cello, and double bass. One of Schubert's last works is the Octet (D803), written in 1824, which adds a second violin to Beethoven's Septet scoring.

The combination of horn with violin and piano is called a horn trio, and though Brahms's Horn Trio was not the first example, it nevertheless was the first important work in the genre and inspired many later composers to write for the same grouping, notably Lennox Berkeley (ca.1953), Don Banks (1962), and György Ligeti (1982).
