= Vienna horn =

Type of musical horn

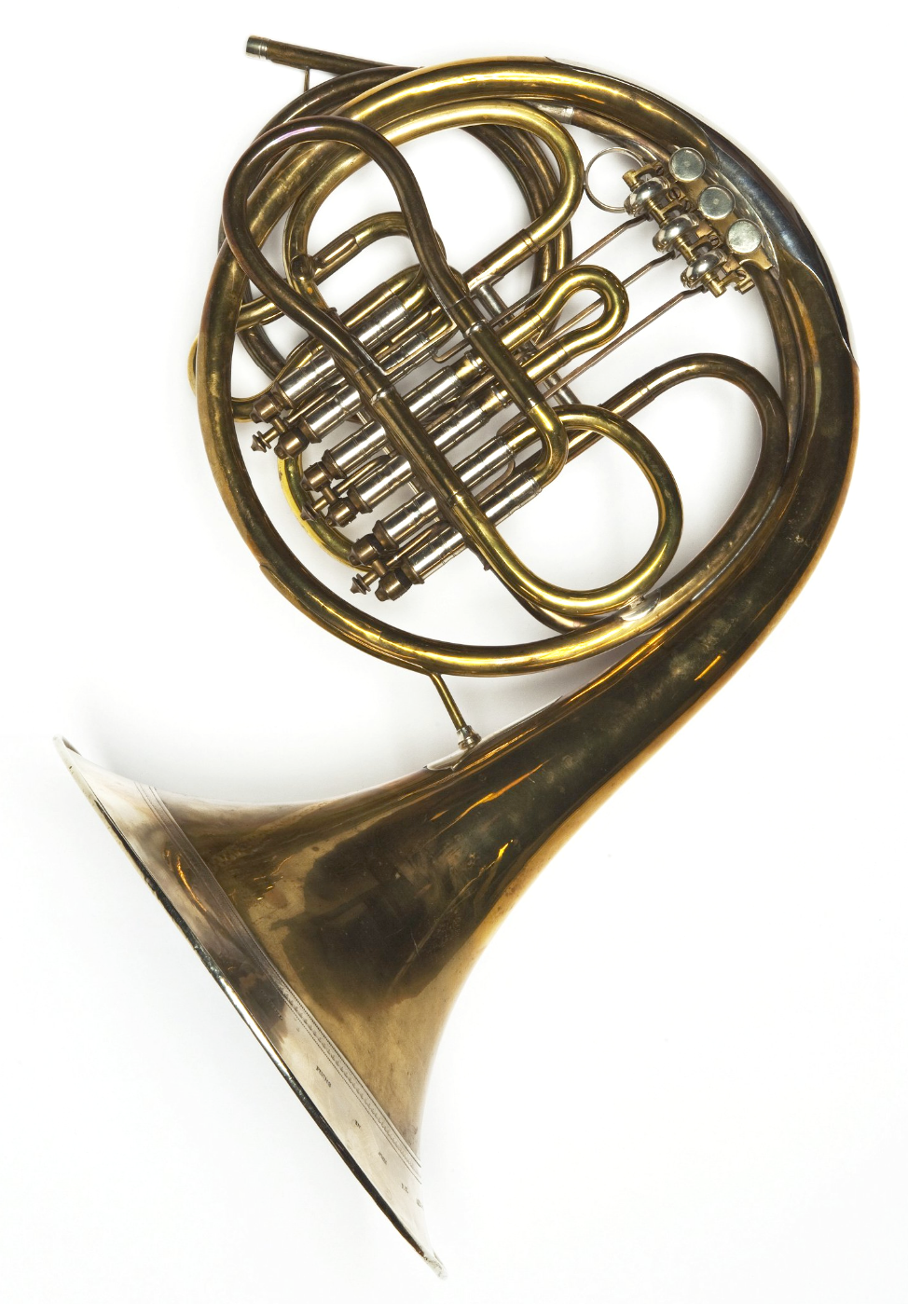
Vienna horn by Fuchs, late 19th century

The Vienna horn (German: Wiener Horn) is a type of musical horn used primarily in Vienna, Austria, for playing orchestral or classical music. It is used throughout Vienna, including the Vienna Philharmonic and Wiener Staatsoper.

== History ==
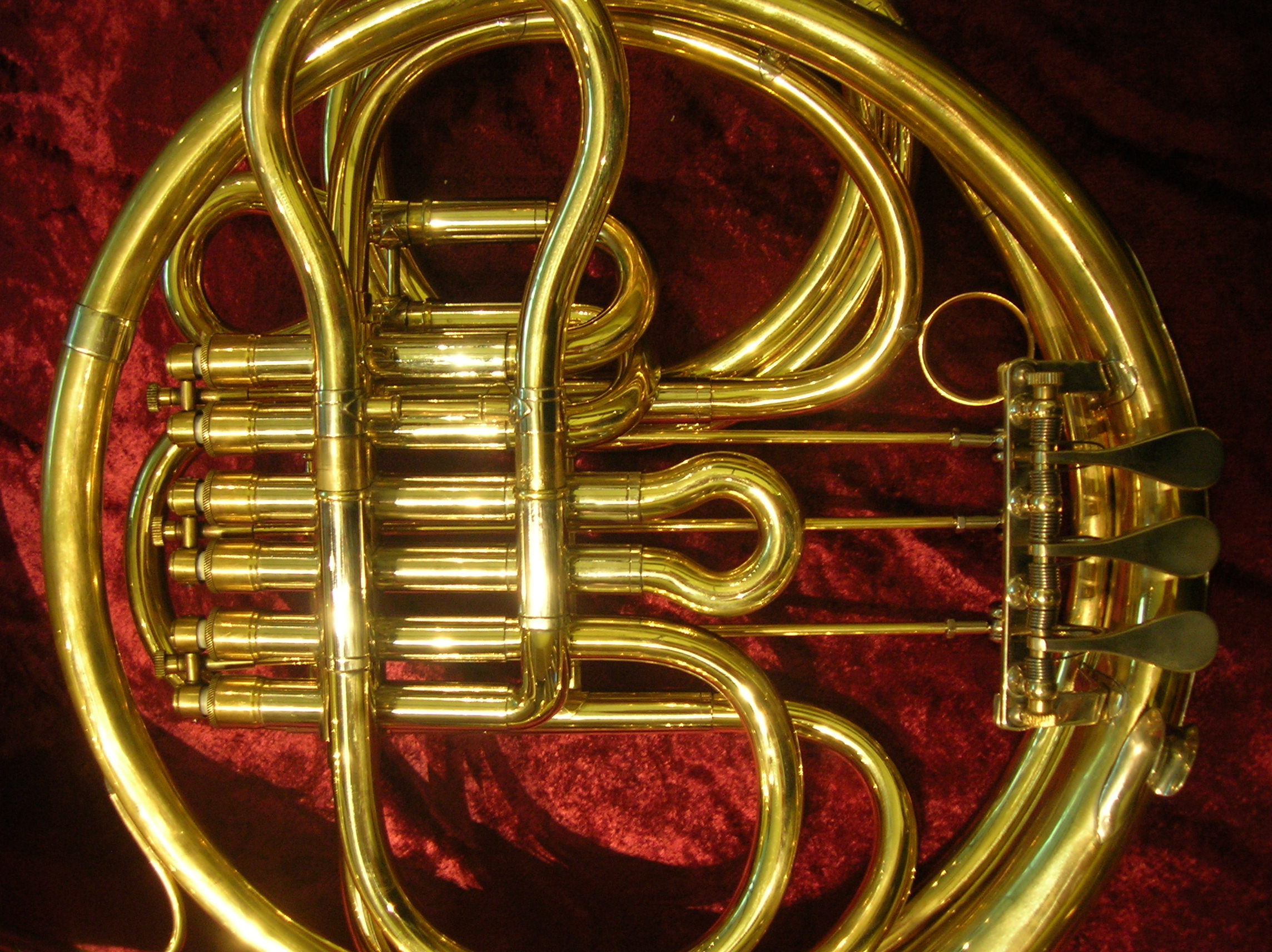
Valves of a Vienna horn, operated by long push-rods from the 3 teardrop lever keys, right

During the nineteenth century, a number of experiments were made in adding valves to the natural horn to enable it to play chromatically without the need for hand-stopping. These experiments included adding piston valves (as used in modern trumpets) to a single F horn. The horn was still crooked, by inserting other tubing, to re-tune the instrument for music written in base keys other than F.

== Description ==
The Vienna horn uses a unique form of valve, patented by Josef Riedl and Josef Kail in 1823 as the Doppelrohr-Schubventile ("double-piston valve"). It is similar to the standard piston valve, but it is not pushed directly inward. The Viennese maker Leopold Uhlmann patented in 1830 a mechanism of long push-rods that reach across to connect to each lever key via a clock spring, as with rotary valves (patented shortly afterwards by Riedl in 1835). The mechanism allows either a fast or slow change in the valve, by controlling lever speed. The valve allows the air to flow straight when the valves are not actuated. When a valve is engaged, each cylinder redirects the air stream 90 degrees in one bend, lessening the resistance felt by the player. This type of valve is one of the many contributing factors to the liquid legato that is one of the trademarks of the Viennese school. However, the indirect linkage between the fingers and the valves can make the action slower and therefore make quick technical passages more difficult for the player.

The internal diameter of the Vienna horn is also smaller than more modern horns. This bore size and shape is actually very close to the design of the valve-less natural horns. The removable crooks (usually an F and A and/or B♭) are also smoothly tapered for the length of the horn. Thus, there is no "compromise" (of dual tubing) as found in the modern double horn and triple horn.

Although subsequent developments, including the rotary valve and double horn, supplanted these horns in most places, the pumpenvalve horn was retained in Vienna because it sounds more like the natural horn: with a more mellow sound and arguably smoother legato. This is due in part to the piston valves and in part to the larger throated (but smaller diameter) bell-flare still used with these instruments. The Vienna horn has remained virtually unchanged since the mid-nineteenth century.

Horn players who use the Vienna horn also use a natural horn mouthpiece, which is less concave than a typical double horn mouthpiece. A standard horn mouthpiece is more concave, partly to facilitate the playing of lower notes because of lower impedance of the double horn.

== Bibliography ==
- Herbert, Trevor; Myers, Arnold; Wallace, John, eds. (2019). The Cambridge Encyclopedia of Brass Instruments. Cambridge University Press. doi:10.1017/9781316841273. ISBN 978-1-316-63185-0. OL 34730943M. Wikidata Q136027509.
- Tuckwell, Barry (1983). Horn. London: Macdonald & Co. ISBN 0-356-09097-3. OL 3250506M. Wikidata Q137191978.
