= Malakat =

Malakat may refer to:

- Kakaki, metal trumpets used in the traditional musics of various African cultures
- Ma malakat aymanukum, an Arabic phrase that appears in the Qur'an
