= Kakaki =

African traditional metal trumpet

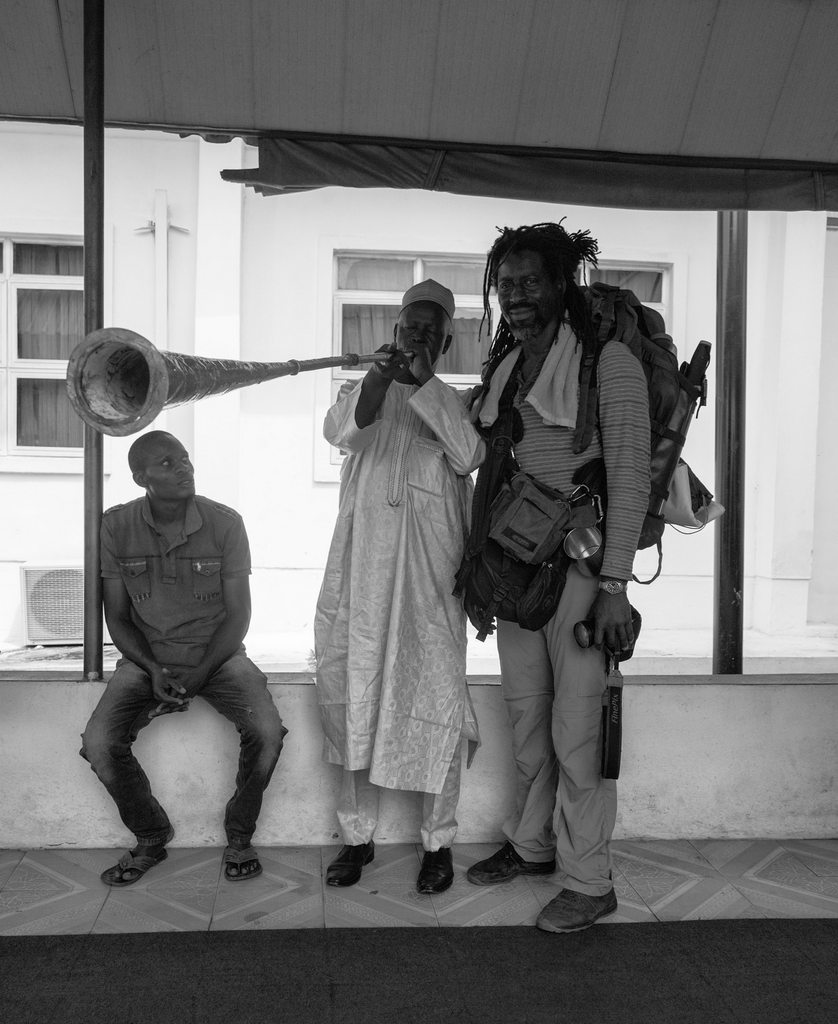
Kakaki player at the palace of the Ooni of Ife, in Osun state, western Nigeria

The kakaki is a three- to four-metre-long metal trumpet used in Hausa, Yoruba, and Nupe traditional ceremonial music. Kakaki is the name used in Chad, Burkina Faso, Ghana, Benin, Niger, and Nigeria.

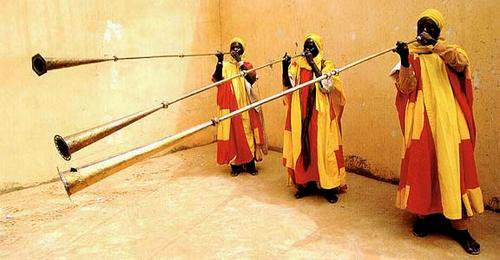
The Kakaki, also known as "Waza" or "Malakat", is a three- to four-meter-long metal trumpet used in African Hausa.

The instrument is also known as malakat or mäläkät (መለከት) in Ethiopia and Eritrea.

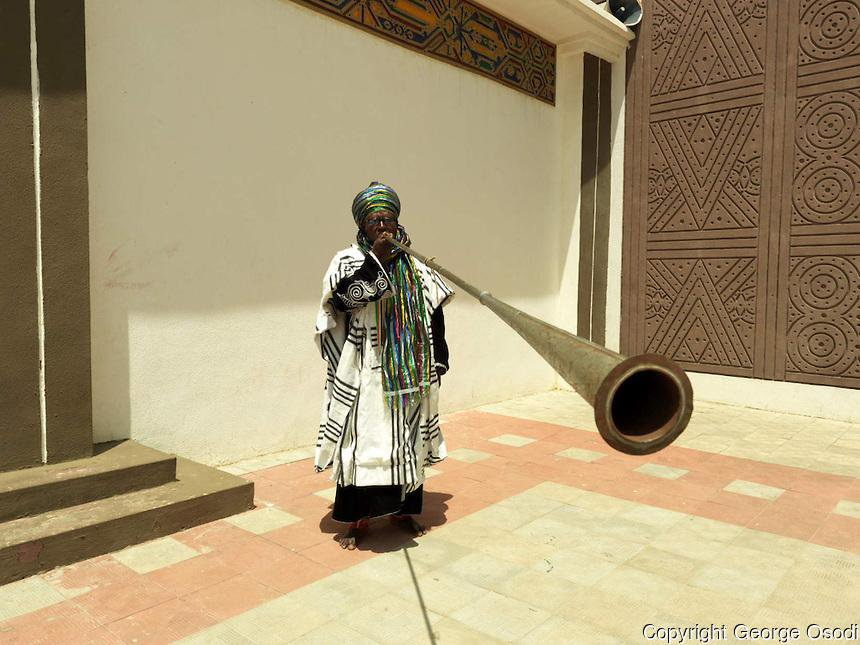
Kakaki is a long metal trumpet used in Hausa traditional ceremonial music. It could be anything from three metres in length.

An ancient instrument, the kakaki was predominant among Songhai cavalry. Its sound is associated with royalty and it is only played at events at the palace of the king or sultan in Hausa societies. It is used as part of the sara, a weekly statement of power and authority. Kakaki are exclusively played by men.

== See also ==
- Nafir#Africa
- Hausa music
- Fanfare
- Wazza
