= Giovanni Punto =

Horn virtuosu from Bohemia (1746–1803)

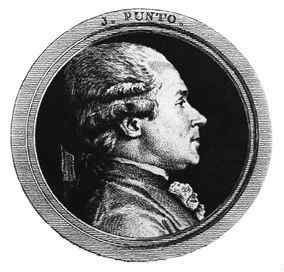
Giovanni Punto

Jan Václav Stich, better known as Giovanni Punto (28 September 1746 – 16 February 1803) was a horn player from Bohemia and a pioneer of the hand-stopping technique which allows natural horns to play a greater number of notes.

== Early life ==
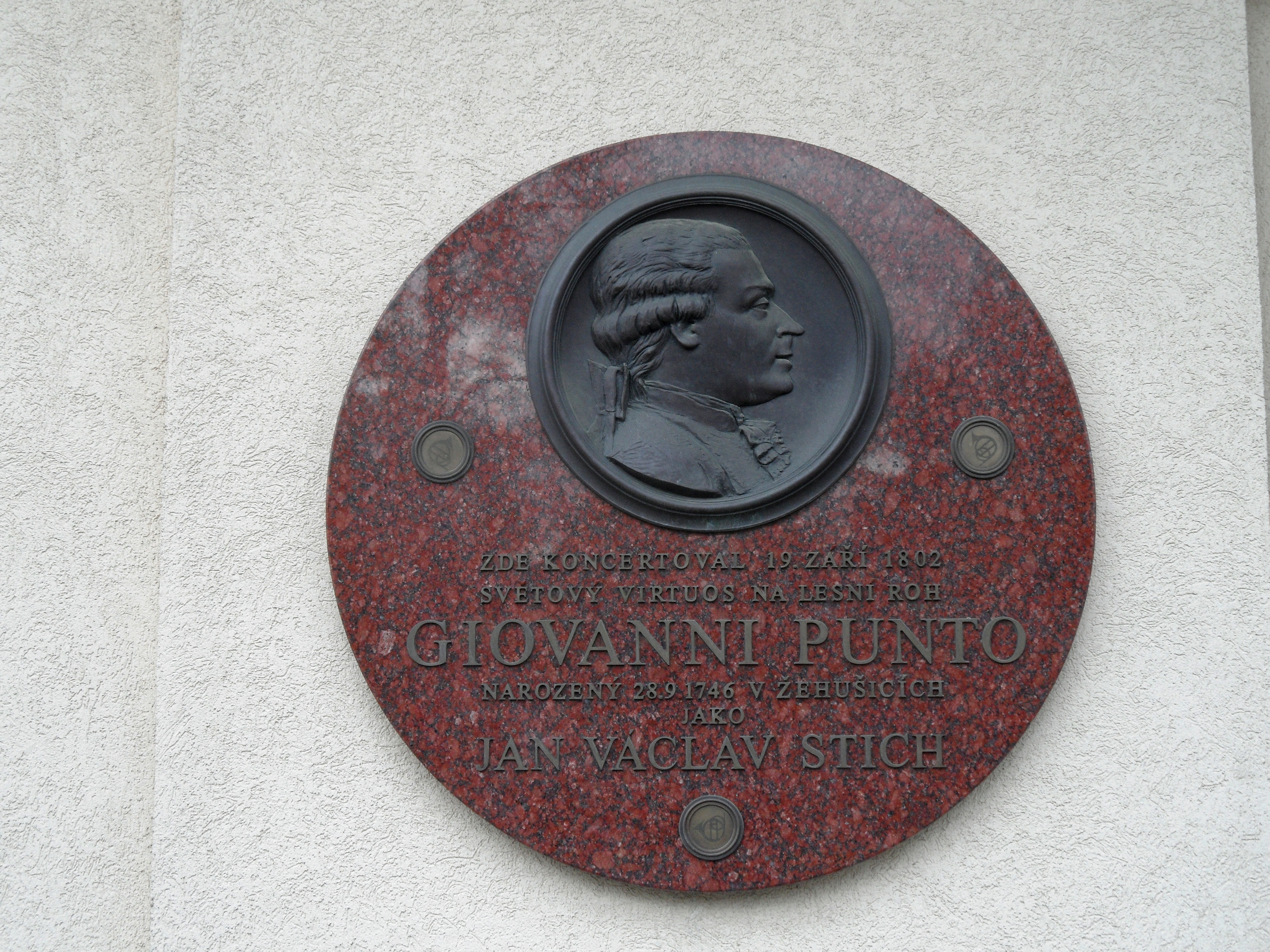
Memorial plaque at Čáslav

Stich was born in Žehušice in Bohemia. His father was a serf bonded to the estate of Count Joseph Johann Thun und Hohenstein, but Stich was taught singing, violin and finally the horn. The count sent him to study horn under Joseph Matiegka in Prague, Jan Schindelarz in Munich, and finally with A. J. Hampel in Dresden (from 1763 to 1764). Hampel first taught Stich the hand-stopping technique which he later improved and extended.

Stich then returned to the service of the count, where he remained for the next four years. At the age of 20 Stich and four friends ran away from the estate. The count, who had invested heavily in Stich's education, dispatched soldiers with orders to knock out Stich's front teeth to prevent him ever playing the horn again, but they failed to capture the group, and Stich crossed into Italy.

== Punto around Europe ==
On arriving in Italy, Stich changed his name to Giovanni Punto (an Italianisation of his surname, 'Stich' = 'point') and went to work in the orchestra of Josef Friedrich Wilhelm, Prince of Hohenzollern-Hechingen. From there he moved to Mainz, to the court orchestra, but left after a few years when they did not give him the post of Konzertmeister. After this he began to travel and play as a soloist, touring much of Europe including England. Charles Burney heard him play in Koblenz in 1772, describing Punto as "the celebrated French horn from Bohemia, whose taste and astonishing execution were lately so applauded in London".

Punto was particularly active in Paris, playing there 49 times between 1776 and 1788, but his use of hand-stopping was criticized by some in London, possibly due to the novelty of the technique. In 1777, he was invited to teach the horn players in the private orchestra of George III.

Punto also composed pieces to demonstrate his own virtuosity (a common practice then), which indicate that he was a master of quick arpeggios and stepwise passagework.

In 1778 Punto met W. A. Mozart in Paris, after which Mozart reported to his father Leopold that "Punto plays magnifique". Punto was to play the horn part in Mozart's Sinfonia Concertante for Four Winds, K. 297b, but at the last minute this was dropped from the programme and subsequently lost. The same year Punto probably entered into an arrangement with some Parisian publishers; nearly all his subsequent compositions were published in Paris, whereas they were previously listed in Breitkopf's catalogue. A new horn was also made for him in 1778, a silver cor solo, which he used for the rest of his life.

Punto sought a permanent position in which he could conduct as well as compose and play, and in 1781 he entered the service of Franz Ludwig von Erthal, the Prince-bishop of Würzburg, later moving to become the Konzertmeister (with a pension) for the Comte d’Artois (later to become Charles X of France) in Paris. He was successful enough in this role that in 1787 he was able to secure leave of absence and tour the Rhineland in his own coach, a mark of considerable wealth at the time.

On returning to Paris in 1789, Punto was appointed conductor of the Théâtre des Variétés-Amusantes, where he remained for ten years, leaving in 1799 when he was not appointed to the staff of the newly founded Paris Conservatoire. Moving on to Vienna via Munich, Punto met Ludwig van Beethoven, who wrote his Op. 17 Sonata for Horn and Piano for the two of them. They premiered the work on 18 April 1800 at the Theater am Kärntnertor and played the work again the following month in Pest, Hungary.

== Return home ==
In 1801, Punto returned to his homeland after 33 years, playing a grand concert on 18 May in the Estates Theatre in Prague. A reviewer commented that Punto "received enthusiastic applause for his concertos because of his unparalleled mastery, and respected musicians said that they had never before heard horn playing like it". The reviewer commented on his innovative techniques, noting that "in his cadenzas he produced many novel effects, playing two and even three-part chords", and added that Punto was evidence that Bohemia was able to produce "great artistic and musical geniuses".

In 1802, after a concert tour in Paris with Jan Ladislav Dussek, Punto developed pleurisy. He died five months later on 16 February 1803, being accorded a "magnificent" funeral in the Church of St. Nicholas, Prague, attended by thousands. Mozart's Requiem was performed at the graveside.

== Legacy ==
Franz Joseph Fröhlich wrote that "what distinguished Punto, in a way that one has never heard in any other artist heretofore, was his most magnificent performance, the gentlest portrayals, the thunder of tones and their sweetest indescribable blending of nuances with the most varied tone production, an agile tongue, dexterous in all forms of articulation, single and double tones, and even chords, but most important, a silver-bright and charming cantabile tone."

Among his surviving compositions are:

- 16 horn concerti (nos. 9, 12, 13, 15 and 16 lost)
- a concerto for two horns and 103 horn duos
- 47 horn trios
- 21 horn quartets
- a horn sextet
- a concerto for clarinet
- a book of daily exercises for horn

== Sources ==
- Branberger, Jan: Jan Václav Stich – Citoyen Punto, Městské Knihy Žehušice, 2012. Biography with many references and with the list of Punto's compositions.
- Sadie, Stanley (ed.), The New Grove Dictionary of Music and Musicians, 2nd edition. Grove's Dictionaries, New York, 2000
- Tuckwell, Barry: The French Horn (from the Yehudi Menuhin instrumental series)
- Constantin von Wurzbach: "Punto, Johann Wenzel." In: Biographisches Lexikon des Kaiserthums Oesterreich (Biographical Lexicon of the Empire of Austria). Part 24 Kaiserlich-königliche Hof- und Staatsdruckerei, Vienna 1872, p. 81–83 (digitalised).

== French bibliography ==
- Joann Élart, "Circulation des quatre symphonies oeuvre VII de Johann Franz Xaver Sterkel de l'Allemagne à Rouen : un itinéraire singulier du goût musical entre 1770 et 1825", Studien zu den deutsch-französischen Musikbeziehungen im 18. und 19. Jahrhundert, bericht über die erste gemeinsame Jahrestagung der Gesellschaft für Musikforschung und der Société française de musicologie Saarbrücken 1999 (Hildesheim : Georg Olms Verlag, 2002), pp. 266–281.
- Joann Élart and Patrick Taïeb, "La Complainte du Troubadour de Pierre-Jean Garat (1762–1823)", Les Orages, no. 2, L'imaginaire du héros (Besançon : Apocope, May 2003), p. 137–168.
- Joann Élart, "La mobilité des musiciens et des répertoires : Punto, Garat et Rode aux concerts du Musée", Le Musée de Bordeaux et la musique 1783–1793, eds. Patrick Taïeb, Natalie Morel-Borotra and Jean Gribenski (Rouen : PURH, 2005), pp. 157–173.
- Joann Élart, "Les origines du concert public à Rouen à la fin de l'Ancien Régime", Revue de musicologie, no. 93/1 (2007), p. 53–73.
- Joann Élart, Musiciens et répertoires de concert en France à la fin de l'Ancien Régime, doctoral thesis, supervised by Patrick Taïeb, University of Rouen, 2005.
  - All listed at "M. Joann Élart", University of Rouen
