= Crook (music) =

Exchangeable segment of tubing in a natural horn

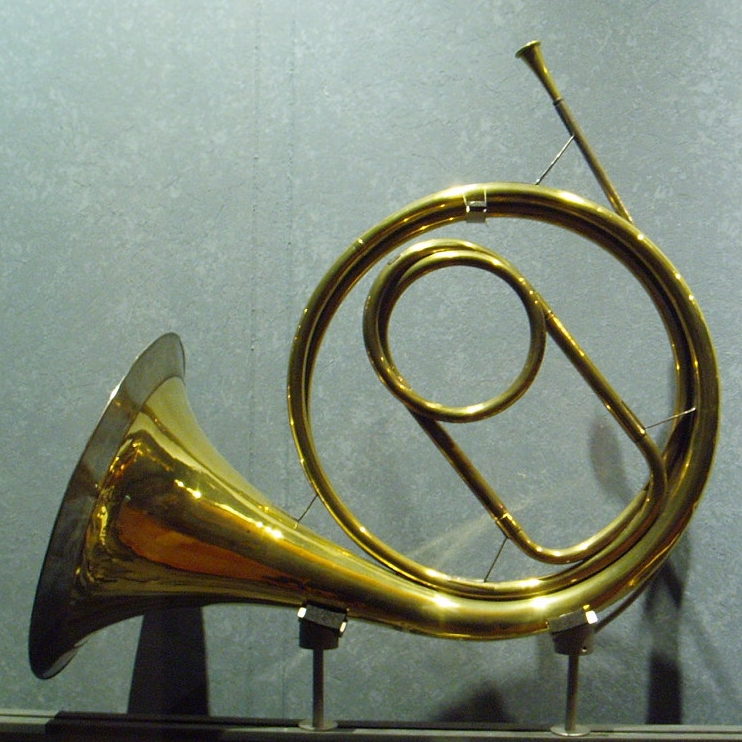
"Cor solo" (natural horn) – Raoux, Paris, 1797 – Paris, Musée de la Musique (with a double-loop crook located within the body of the horn).

A crook, also sometimes called a shank, is an exchangeable segment of tubing in a natural horn (or other brass instrument, such as a natural trumpet) which is used to change the length of the pipe, altering the fundamental pitch and harmonic series which the instrument can sound, and thus the key in which it plays.

== Master crook and coupler system ==
Early horns had unalterable lengths and permanently attached mouthpieces. This presented problems in concert situations. A different horn was required for different keys, and the instrument could not be tuned. Around 1700 the Leichnamschneider brothers in Vienna developed a horn with a removable mouthpiece that could be connected to a short piece of tubing, called a master crook. Additional pieces, couplers, of different lengths were inserted between the master crook and the body of the horn to change the horn's length, and thus the pitch. Fine-tuning was done with even shorter segments called tuning bits. This simple and relatively inexpensive solution remained in use even into the 19th century. Charles Tully's Tutor for the French Horn, published in London, recommended this system for beginners as late as 1840.

The master crook and coupler system presented some problems. In high keys, the instrument was uncomfortably close to the face, while in low keys, so many pieces needed to be added that the instrument could become unstable, adversely affecting the accuracy of the playing. Moreover, the instrument became so long that it was sometimes difficult to reach the bell for hand-stopping, a technique for lowering the pitch of individual notes a semitone or more. This important innovation had been introduced around 1720, and codified by Anton Hampel of Dresden in about 1750, so that the horn could be played chromatically.

== Inventionshorn ==
To get around these problems Hampel devised a new instrument, the inventionshorn, in which detachable crooks (or inventions) were inserted not in the mouth pipe, but in the middle of the horn. This presented the new problem of fitting the longest and shortest crooks into the same small space. Working with the Dresden instrument maker Johann Werner, Hampel perfected the Inventionshorn sometime between 1750 and 1755. The new horn was capable of the full range of transpositions and quickly became a regular member of the developing symphony orchestra. Fine-tuning of the Inventionshorn remained a problem until J. G. Haltenhof replaced the tenon and socket fittings with slides in 1776. About 4 years later the Parisian instrument makers Joseph and Lucien-Joseph Raoux, in collaboration with Carl Türrschmidt, came out with the cor solo, a refined version for soloists with crooks in G, F, E, E♭, and D. (Orchestra players needed more crooks since they needed to play in more keys).

The Inventionshorn design was also applied to other brass instruments. Some examples are a pair of invention trumpets by Michael Saurle (1805) at the National Music Museum.

== Terminal crooks ==
Around 1800 in France terminal crooks were invented, which proved to be extremely popular. These instruments used a separate crook for each key, and the crooks maintained a fairly uniform distance between the mouthpiece and the body of the instrument. Horn players typically needed at least eight crooks, for B♭-alto, A, G, F, E, E♭, D, and C. After about 1828, an additional crook in A♭-alto was also included. Although crooks for low B and B♭ were also occasionally made, these keys were usually reached by adding couplers to the C crook. Horns constructed with the large number of crooks needed for playing in an orchestra are sometimes referred to as orchestral horns ("Orchesterhorn" in German). The main disadvantage of this system was that so many crooks needed to be transported. The large cases required for carrying them were often works of art themselves.

== Characteristics of manual crooks ==
According to John Humphries' The Early Horn, A Practical Guide:

The discovery of crooks is usually a great and unexpected pleasure to performers who have previously used only modern double horns, for they differ greatly in timbre and response. The highest keys, B♭ and A, are very focused and penetrating in tone, and respond quickly, making rapid tonguing easy, but they soon become tiring to play because they are usually used for very high parts. At the opposite end of the spectrum, the low B♭ and C crooks have a rich, dark almost muddy tone, but, because of their length — B♭ has 18 feet (about 5.5m) of tubing — are slow to speak. Indeed, the difference in response between a horn crooked in B♭ alto and one in B♭ basso is akin to the difference in handling between a sports car and a lorry.

== The invention of valves ==
The use of crooks in conjunction with hand-stopping made the horn into an almost completely chromatic instrument, but the change in timbre associated with stopped notes, and the length of time needed to change crooks, did greatly limit their usefulness. The addition of valves around 1815 by Heinrich Stölzel and Friedrich Blühmel revolutionized the playing of many brass instruments and the music that could be written for them. The name "valves" is somewhat misleading since what is involved is that the crooks have become a permanent part of the instrument, and are opened and closed in various combinations by the use of valves, rendering the switching between crooks effectively instantaneous (see also the articles on the French horn, the cornet, and the valved trumpet).

== Hybrid instruments ==
In the 19th century, brass instruments were produced which incorporated many of the features described above in one design. For instance, the National Music Museum has a German (or Austrian) trumpet in G (NMM 07077), ca. 1840, which includes terminal crooks, two-piston valves, and a tuning slide. The museum also has a cornet (cornopean in B-flat, Raoux, Paris, ca. 1850, NMM 6852) with terminal crooks, Stölzel valves, tuning slide, and tuning shanks, one of which was also used as a coupler.

Modern Vienna horns are manufactured with a detachable F crook, and occasionally B♭ or A crooks are substituted.

== See also ==
- Cité de la Musique, home of the Musée de la Musique, Paris
- Extension (music)

== Sources ==
- Apel, Willi, ed. (1969). Harvard Dictionary of Music (2nd ed.). Cambridge, MA: The Belknap Press of Harvard University Press. ISBN 0-674-37501-7
- Humphries, John (2000). The Early Horn. A Practical Guide. Cambridge, UK: Cambridge University Press. ISBN 0-521-63210-2. (See preview at Google books. Accessed 22 May 2009)
- Nelson, Kayla (2007). "Horn History" (archived copy). Accessed 22 May 2009.
- University of Edinburgh Collection of Historic Musical Instruments (archived copy). Accessed 30 May 2009.
