= Anton Joseph Hampel =

Anton Joseph (A. J.) Hampel (1710 – 30 March 1771) was a horn player who is generally credited with having developed, somewhere between 1750 and 1760, the technique of hand-stopping which allows natural horns to play fully chromatically. This was one of the most important innovations in the history of the horn, comparable with Heinrich Stölzel's development of the first valve horn in 1817.

It was this development that enabled the horn repertoire of Haydn, Mozart, Weber and others to be written.

Hampel was born in Prague, but worked in Dresden, Germany, with instrument maker Johann Georg Werner, collaborating on the design of the so-called Inventionshorn, which used sliding medial crooks inside the hoop in an attempt to achieve a fully chromatic instrument.

Hampel also taught Giovanni Punto, who went on to refine the hand-stopping technique and spread it through Europe, inspiring works from composers such as Beethoven.
