= Wazza =

African musical instrument and music style

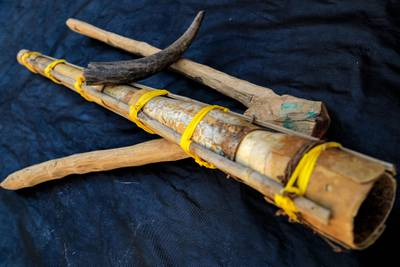
Photograph of a wazza

The wazza, also referred to as al-Wazza, is a type of natural horn played in Sudanese music. The wazza is a long wind instrument, constructed by joining several wooden tubes to form an elaborate gourd trumpet, and while blown, it is also tapped for percussive effect. Characteristically, it has been used by the Berta people of the Blue Nile State in Sudan. Across the Blue Nile State communities, it has been use for generations to guide in the harvest season.

Before it can be played, the instrument must be made wet with water, so it produces its intended sound. Several wazza trumpets of different sizes and tone ranges are used simultaneously by several players, performing their sounds in African polyrhythmic patterns.

== See also ==
- Music of Sudan
