= Nyele =

Small Zambian musical horn

The nyele is a small horn made from hollowed out animal horn or matete reed. The nyele is played in groups; one man plays one note and others play different pitches, which combine to form a certain combination of sounds. Traditionally, the nyele were played along with the budima drums at funerals of the so-called Valley Tonga in Zambia.

The nyele is sometimes decorated with European paints, a sleeve of snakeskin or seed beads pressed into bees wax. They are used by men and youth at both formal and informal dances.

They are commonly played with drums and not by themselves alone, and are employed for funerals, large gatherings, and other ceremonial occasions. They vary in size from about 5 inches to 18 inches (13 cm to 46 cm) long.
