= Waqra phuku =

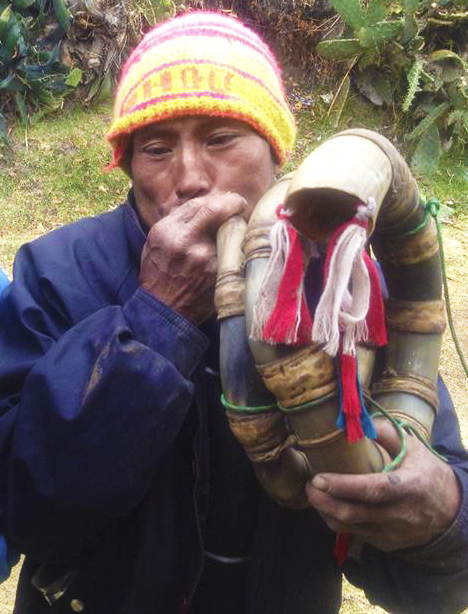
Waqrapuku

The waqra phuku (Quechua waqra 'horn', phuku 'blow', also spelled wakrapuku, waqrapuku) is a type of trumpet used by indigenous peoples in Peru and the Andes. It is usually made from cattle horn or metal and is used in annual fertility rituals. Unlike the pututu (Titanostrombus galeatus), which was used in pre-Columbian times, the waqra phuku was adapted from cattle introduced by the Spaniards in the sixteenth century.
