= Hand-stopping =

Horn-playing technique

Hand-stopping is a technique by which a natural horn or a natural trumpet can be made to produce notes outside of its normal harmonic series. By inserting the hand, cupped, into the bell, the player can reduce or raise the pitch of a note by a semitone or more. This, combined with the use of crooks changing the key of the instrument, allowed composers to write fully chromatic music for the horn and almost fully chromatic music for the trumpet before the invention of piston and valve horns and trumpets in the early 19th Century. A stopped note is called gestopft in German and bouché in French.

The technique was invented in Europe in the mid 18th Century, and its first celebrated exponent was Giovanni Punto, who learned the technique from A. J. Hampel and subsequently taught it to the Court orchestra of George III.

In addition to the change in pitch, the timbre is changed, sounding somewhat muted. Some pieces call for notes to be played stopped (sometimes written as gestopft in the score) specifically in order to produce this muted tone. This can clearly be heard on recordings of natural horns playing pre-valve repertoire such as the Punto concertino (a recording by Anthony Halstead and the Hanover Band is available which demonstrates this to particularly good effect).

The pitch control is affected by the degree of closing the bell with the right hand. As the palm closes the bell, the effective tube length is increased, lowering the pitch (up to about a semitone for horns in the range D through G). But when the hand stops the bell completely, the tube length is shortened, raising pitch about a semitone for horns tuned near to the key of F.
