= Natural horn =

Unvalved ancestor of modern-day horn

Natural Horn
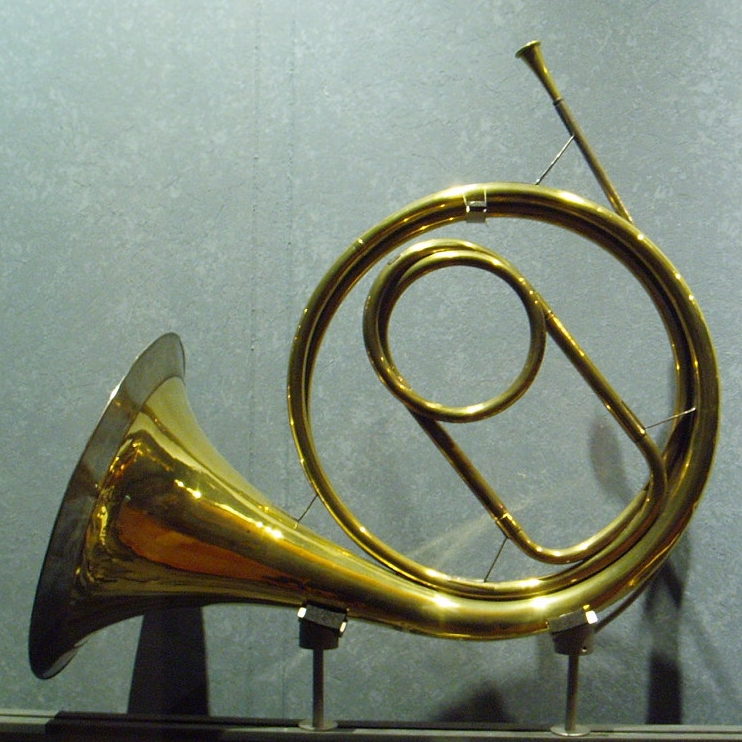
- "Cor Solo", Raoux, Paris, 1797
- Classification: Brass instrument
- Hornbostel–Sachs classification: 423.1

Playing range
- B♭_{2} to E♭_{5}

Related instruments
- French horn, Hunting horn

Sound sample
Franz Schubert: Octet, I. Adagio – Allegro

The natural horn is a musical instrument descending from the hunting horn, and is the predecessor to the modern-day French horn. Differentiated by its lack of valves, natural horn relies on a variety of crooks and hand stopping techniques to play the instrument's full range. Throughout the seventeenth and eighteenth centuries, the natural horn evolved separate from the trumpet by widening of the bell and lengthening of the tubes. Natural horn consists of a mouthpiece, a pitched crook, foundational tubing, and flared bell. This instrument was used extensively until the emergence of the valved horn in the early 19th century.

== Hand-stopping technique ==
The natural horn has several gaps in its harmonic range. To play chromatically, in addition to crooking the instrument into the right key, users require two additional techniques: bending and hand-stopping. Bending a note is achieved by modifying the embouchure to raise or lower the pitch fractionally, and compensates for the slightly out-of-pitch "wolf tones" which all brass instruments have. Hand-stopping is a technique whereby the player can modify the pitch of a note by up to a semitone (or sometimes slightly more) by inserting a cupped hand into the bell. Both techniques change the timbre as well as the pitch.

It is commonly thought that hand technique emerged during the first half of the eighteenth century at the Dresden court with the horn player Anton Joseph Hampel. Heinrich Domnich (1807) cited Hampel as the inventor of this technique and recounted the "invention" in which Hampel, trying to emulate oboist colleagues who used cotton plugs to "mute" their instruments, tried the same with his horn and was "surprised to find that the pitch of his instrument rose by a semitone. In a flash of inspiration he realised that by alternately inserting and withdrawing the cotton plug he could cover without a break every diatonic and chromatic scale."

Pitch changes are made through a few techniques:

- Modulating the lip tension as done with modern brass instruments. This allows for notes in the harmonic series to be played.
- Changing the length of the instrument by switching the crooks. This is a rather slow process. Before the advent of the modern valved horn, many ideas were attempted to speed up the process of changing the key of the instrument. Crooks were in common use by 1740.
- Changing the position of the hand in the bell; this is called hand-stopping. The effect is a pitch that lowers the harmonic, but dampens the sound.

== The Inventionshorn and tuning slide ==
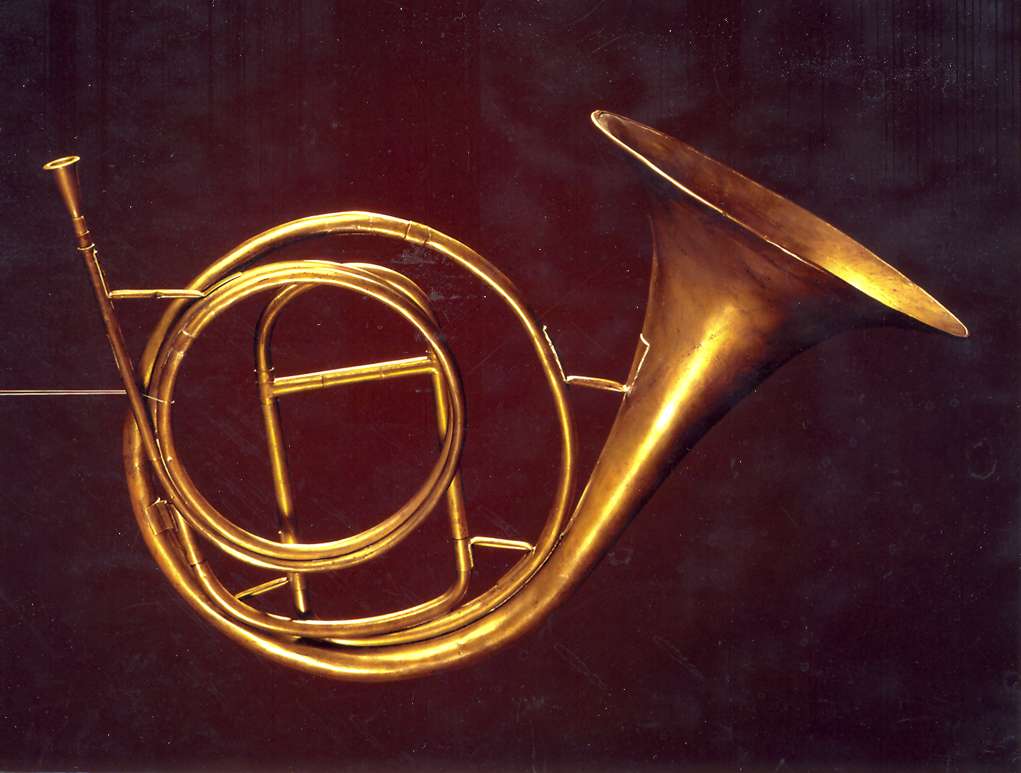
Inventionshorn

In 1753 Anton Hampel alongside Johann Werner, developed the Inventionshorn, built with a fixed mouthpiece so that the horn remained at the same distance no matter how many crooks were added. This aspect of the Inventionshorn influenced the modern day double sided horn the F and B♭ harmonic series.

Horn with crooks

Johann Gottfried Haltemhof, in the 1770s designed the tuning slide system lengthening the tenons into slides to make it possible to tune the horn and that system is still used on modern day horns.

== Crooks ==
Crooks are also used for transpositions on the modern day horn.

Key of crooks	Ranges of harmonics		Crook length	Transposes
B♭ alto	B♭_{2}–D_{5}	2nd–10th	16in	Major 2nd lower
A	A_{2}–C♯_{5}	2nd–10th	22.5in	minor 3rd lower
A♭	A♭_{2}–C_{5}	2nd–10th	29.5in	Major 3rd lower
G	G_{2}–D_{5}	2nd–12th	36.75in	Perfect 4th lower
F	F_{2}–F_{5}	2nd–16th	52.5in	Perfect fifth lower
E	E_{2}–E_{5}	2nd–16th	61in	minor 6th lower
E♭	E♭_{2}–E♭_{5}	2nd–16th	70.25in	Major 6th lower
D	D_{2}–D_{5}	2nd–16th	80in	minor 7th lower
C basso	G_{2}–C_{5}	3rd–16th	101in	Octave lower
B♭ basso	F_{2}–B♭_{4}	3rd–16th	125in	Major 9th lower

== Repertoire ==
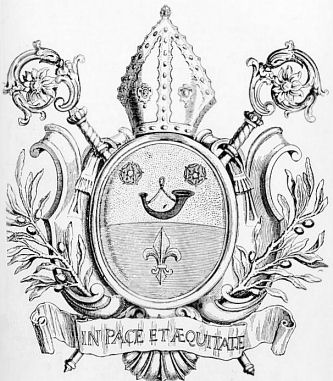
A natural horn in heraldry, crest of Gerardus Rubens

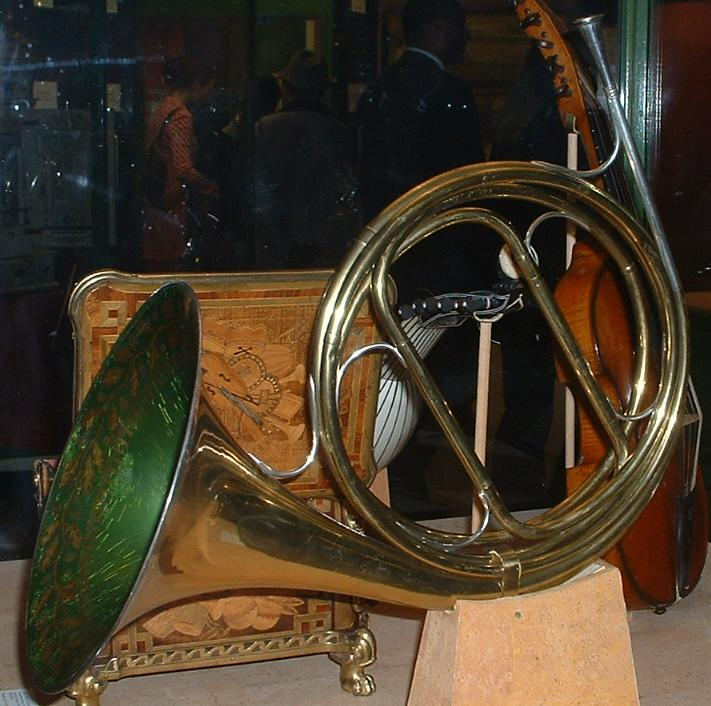
Natural horn in the Victoria and Albert Museum, London

The repertoire for horn includes many pieces that were originally written with the natural horn in mind. Until the development of the modern horn in the early to mid-19th century, Western music employed the natural horn and its natural brass brethren. Substantial contributors to the horn repertoire include Handel, Haydn, Mozart, Beethoven, Telemann, Weber, Brahms and many others.

The chromatic abilities of recently developed brass instruments, however, opened new possibilities for composers of the Romantic era, and fit with the artistic currents of the time. By the end of the 19th century and the beginning of the 20th century, almost all music was written for the modern valved horn.

However, the natural horn still found its way into the works of some composers. Brahms did not care for the valved horn and wrote for natural horn. Benjamin Britten's Serenade for Tenor, Horn and Strings, though written for the modern horn, makes notable use of the F harmonic series and has been performed using the natural horn to produce a "sorrowful tone" as a consequence of its "fragile intonation".

György Ligeti's Hamburg Concerto makes a great use of the natural horn and of natural sounds on the modern horn in the solo part and requires four natural horns in the orchestra.

== Comparative performance demands ==
Beyond note bending and hand stopping, physical difference brought on via the nature of the natural horn, there are nuanced differences in repertoire preparation in comparison to the modern horn. Notably differences in air stream and resistance alter the difficulty of passages, altering the audibly differences in the horns. Mozarts Horn Concerto No. 4, K. 495, is a standard repertoire piece that is suited for both instruments, despite evident differences in execution.

Mozart's first movement, Allegro maestoso, relies heavily on hand movements in the natural horn, shifts in hand stopping between full, three-quarters and open playing whereas the modern horn circumvents these challenges via valves. Phrasing, intended musicality and transposition are comparatively more manageable despite having the same expectations. The simplified focus does not favour only the modern horn, as the second movement, 'Romance (Andante cantabile)', instead benefits the natural horn. The complex tubing of the modern horn increases air resistance and fatigue, whereas the natural horn benefits from the smaller lengths of individual crooks, meaning phrasing and sustain demands can be met with lesser physical straining of the natural horn. The 'Rondo (Allegro vivace)' returns to the virtuosic focus of the opening movement, with the demands of leaps, tempo and articulation remaining challenging regardless of the chosen instrument; the third movement requires precision regardless of valve or hand movements.

== See also ==
- Alphorn
- Natural trumpet
