= Gianna Galli =

Italian operatic soprano (1935–2010)

- Occupation: opera singer

Gianna Galli (photo with 1960 dedication)

Gianna Galli (29 April 1935 – 22 December 2010) was an Italian operatic soprano who had an active international career from the 1950s through the 1970s. She specialized in the lyric soprano repertoire and was particularly known for her portrayals of Puccini heroines.

== Singing career ==
Born in Modena, Galli began studying singing in her youth. In 1952, at the age of 17, she won the international singing competition in Spoleto. Later that year, she made her professional opera debut at the Teatro Comunale Modena. Her career progressed rapidly, and she was soon heard in major opera houses internationally. She became particularly associated with the operas of Giacomo Puccini, with her signature roles being Mimì in La Bohème, Minnie in La fanciulla del West, and the title roles in Manon Lescaut and Tosca. She made her United States debut in 1958 at the New York City Opera as Mimì.

In 1961 Galli created the role of Catherine in the world premiere of Renzo Rossellini's Uno sguardo dal ponte, which was based on Arthur Miller's A View from the Bridge, at the Teatro dell'Opera di Roma. She returned to that theatre in April 1962 to perform the role of Thamar in the premiere of Franco Mannino's La stirpe di Davide. The following June she sang the role of the False Angel in the world premiere of Manuel De Falla's oratorio Atlàntida which was presented in a staged production at La Scala in Milan. Other roles which she created in world premieres were Nicole in Mannino's Il diavolo in giardino (1963, Teatro Massimo) and Slam in Giacomo Manzoni's Atomtod (1965, La Scala).

In her native country, Galli also performed frequently in Italian language operettas. In 1961 she starred in the film adaptation of Carlo Lombardo and Virgilio Ranzato's operetta Il paese dei campanelli which was directed by Vito Molinari. She also made several appearances on Italian television during the 1950s, 1960s and 1970s. She notably performed the role of Lisa in Mario Lanfranchi's 1956 television film of Vincenzo Bellini's La Sonnambula with Anna Moffo as Amina. On disc she recorded the role of Vivetta in Francesco Cilea's L'arlesiana with fellow singers Ferruccio Tagliavini, Pia Tassinari, and Paolo Silveri in 1957.

== Later life and career ==
Galli was forced into retirement in 1975 at age 40 after suffering vocal problems which at that time were not fixable by surgery on the vocal cords. However, her association with the opera world continued through a second successful career as a manager of singers in Italy. She managed, among others, Giuseppe Filianoti and Salvatore Licitra.

== Death ==
Galli lived the last several years of her life in Monte Carlo, Monaco, where she died in 2010, aged 75.
