= Sì (operetta) =

- Operetta by Pietro Mascagni
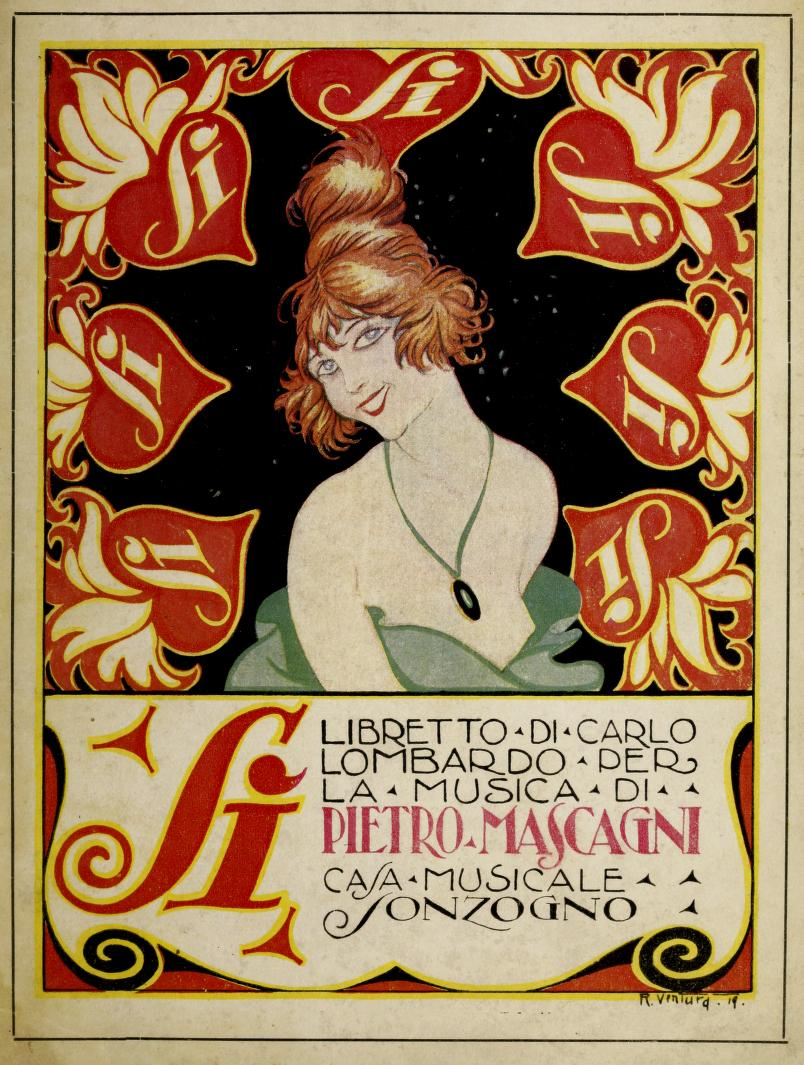
- Libretto cover, published by Sonzogno in 1919
- Librettist: Carlo Lombardo
- Language: Italian
- Premiere: 13 December 1919; Teatro Quirino, Rome

Sì is an operetta in three acts composed by Pietro Mascagni to a libretto by Carlo Lombardo with verses by Arturo Franci. The libretto is based on Lombardo's operetta La duchessa del Bal Tabarin and Felix Dörmann's libretto for Majestät Mimi set by Bruno Granichstaedten in 1911. Mascagni's only venture into operetta, it premiered on 13 December 1919 at the Teatro Quirino in Rome. The operetta takes its name from its central character, Sì, an actress at the Folies Bergère, so called because she could never say no. ("Si" is the Italian word for "yes".)

== Background and performance history ==
The friendship of Mascagni and his librettist, Carlo Lombardo, dated from 1885 when both were working as conductors for Alfonso and Ciro Scognamiglio's travelling operetta company. Mascagni went on to devote himself to composing operas, while Lombardo specialised in operetta as a composer, librettist, and impresario. He directed the Calligaris-Lombardo operetta company and also founded Casa Lombardo, a music publishing firm dedicated to Italian operetta. According to Mascagni's biographer, Roger Flury, Lombardo "tricked" Mascagni into writing an operetta. After Masacagni had given him permission to adapt his opera Le maschere as an operetta, Lombardo proposed writing a new operetta using re-arranged music from various other Mascagni operas. As a sample of what he was planning, Lombardo produced some music from Mascagni's dramatic opera Silvano arranged as a comic duet. Mascagni, horrified by the potential "mutilation" of his scores, agreed to compose a completely new operetta instead.

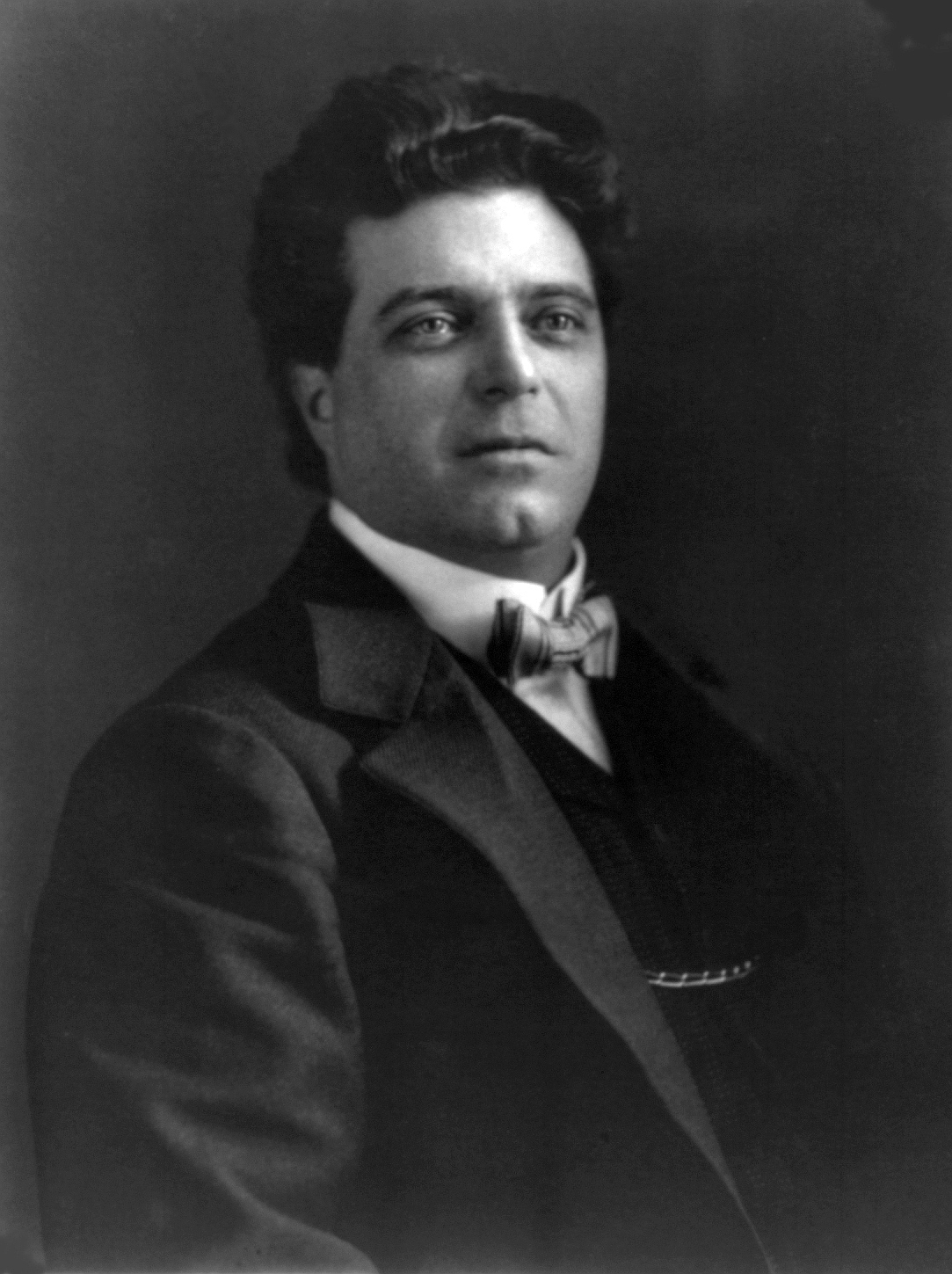
Mascagni in 1902

It was to be his first, and only, venture into the genre. Lombardo wrote the libretto for Sì, basing it on his own operetta La duchessa del Bal Tabarin and on Felix Dörmann's libretto for Majestät Mimi set by Bruno Granichstaedten in 1911. Mascagni composed the score between 1918 and 1919 with some help on the orchestration from his cousin, Mario Mascagni.

Sì premiered on 13 December 1919 at the Teatro Quirino in Rome with several members of the Calligaris-Lombardo operetta company in the cast. The conductor was Lombardo's brother Costantino. The premiere was a great success, although Mascagni had been unhappy with the last-minute changes that the conductor had made to his score. In the ensuing years the operetta was performed throughout Italy to similar success. On 24 January 1925, it premiered in Austria at Vienna's Bürgertheater, sung in a German translation by Josco Schubert. On that occasion it was conducted by Mascagni himself, who restored the score to his original version. The German version conducted by Mascagni was also performed in Baden-Baden, Dresden, and Wiesbaden later that year. The work eventually fell out of the repertoire and has been only infrequently revived, most notably in 1987 at the Teatro Poliziano in Montepulciano (later released on CD) and in 2002 at the Vienna Volksoper with Eva Lind in the title role. Lombardo's libretto was also used in adapted form for Il re di Chez Maxim, a 1919 operetta by Mario Pasquale Costa.

== Roles ==
Roles, voice types, premiere cast
Role	Voice type	Premiere cast, 13 December 1919 Conductor: Costantino Lombardo
Sì, an actress at the Folies Bergère	soprano	Gisella Pozzi
Luciano di Chablis, heir to the dukedom of Chablis	tenor	Orlando Bocci
Vera di Chablis, Luciano's cousin	soprano	Amelia Sanipoli
Cléo de Mérode, Luciano's manservant	tenor	Nuto Navarrini
Romal, a post office manager and director at the Folies Bergère	bass	Leone Gariano
Palmira, a post office clerk	mezzo-soprano	Giuseppina Calligaris
Post office clerks, hotel page boys, servants, bon viveurs

== Recordings ==
- Mascagni: Sì – Margherita Vivian (Sì), Amelia Felle (Vera), Mauro Nicoletti (Luciano di Chablis), Marina Vera Gentile (Palmira), Antonio Comas (Cleo de Mérode), Giulio Liguori (Romal); Orchestra Sinfonica del Cantiere Internazionale d'Arte conducted by Sandro Sanna. Recorded live at the Teatro Poliziano di Montepulciano July 1987 (CD). Label: Bongiovanni #2050
