= Parisina (poem) =

1816 poem by Lord Byron

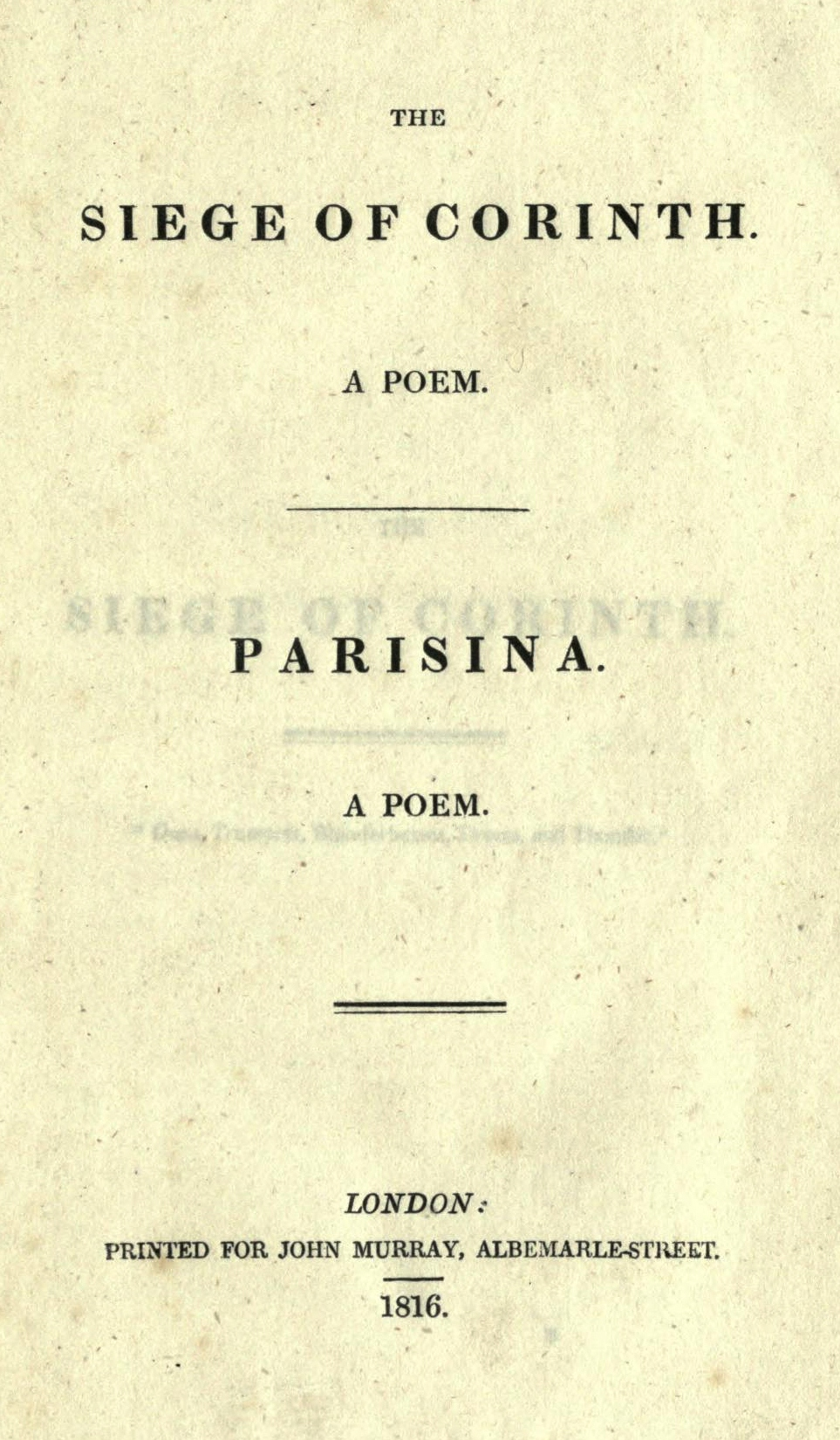
First edition title page

Parisina is a 586-line poem written by Lord Byron. It was probably written between 1812 and 1815, and published on 13 February 1816 with The Siege of Corinth by John Murray in London.

== Background ==
It is based on a story related by Edward Gibbon in his Miscellaneous Works (1796) about Niccolò III d'Este, one of the dukes of Ferrara in the 15th century. Niccolò found out that Parisina Malatesta, his second wife, had an incestuous relationship with his bastard son Ugo and had both of them put to death.

In Byron's poem, Azo (his version of Niccolò) learns of the affair when Parisina mutters the name of Hugo (Ugo) in her sleep. In another embellishment by Byron, Parisina and Hugo were engaged to be married before Azo decided to marry her. Also, Azo sentences only Hugo to death; Parisina's fate is unknown, except for the fact that she is forced to witness Hugo's execution and utters a shriek that indicates approaching madness. Azo is tormented by his decision.

== Operas ==
- Parisina by Gaetano Donizetti, after a libretto by Felice Romani modeled on Byron
- Parisina by Pietro Mascagni, after Gabriele D'Annunzio's libretto who adapted Byron's poem

== Gallery ==
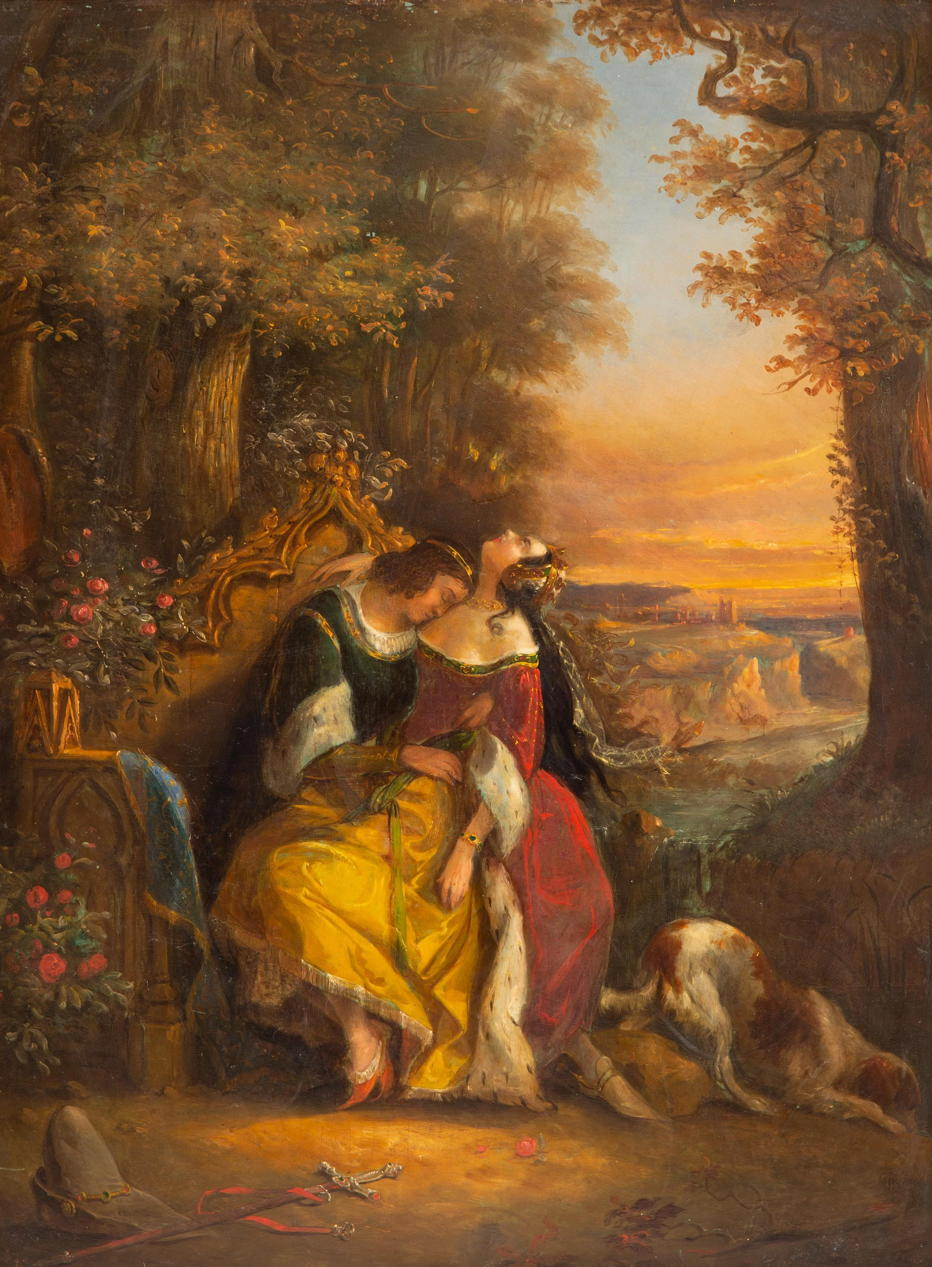
Thomas Jones Barker, Parisina, 1842, private collection

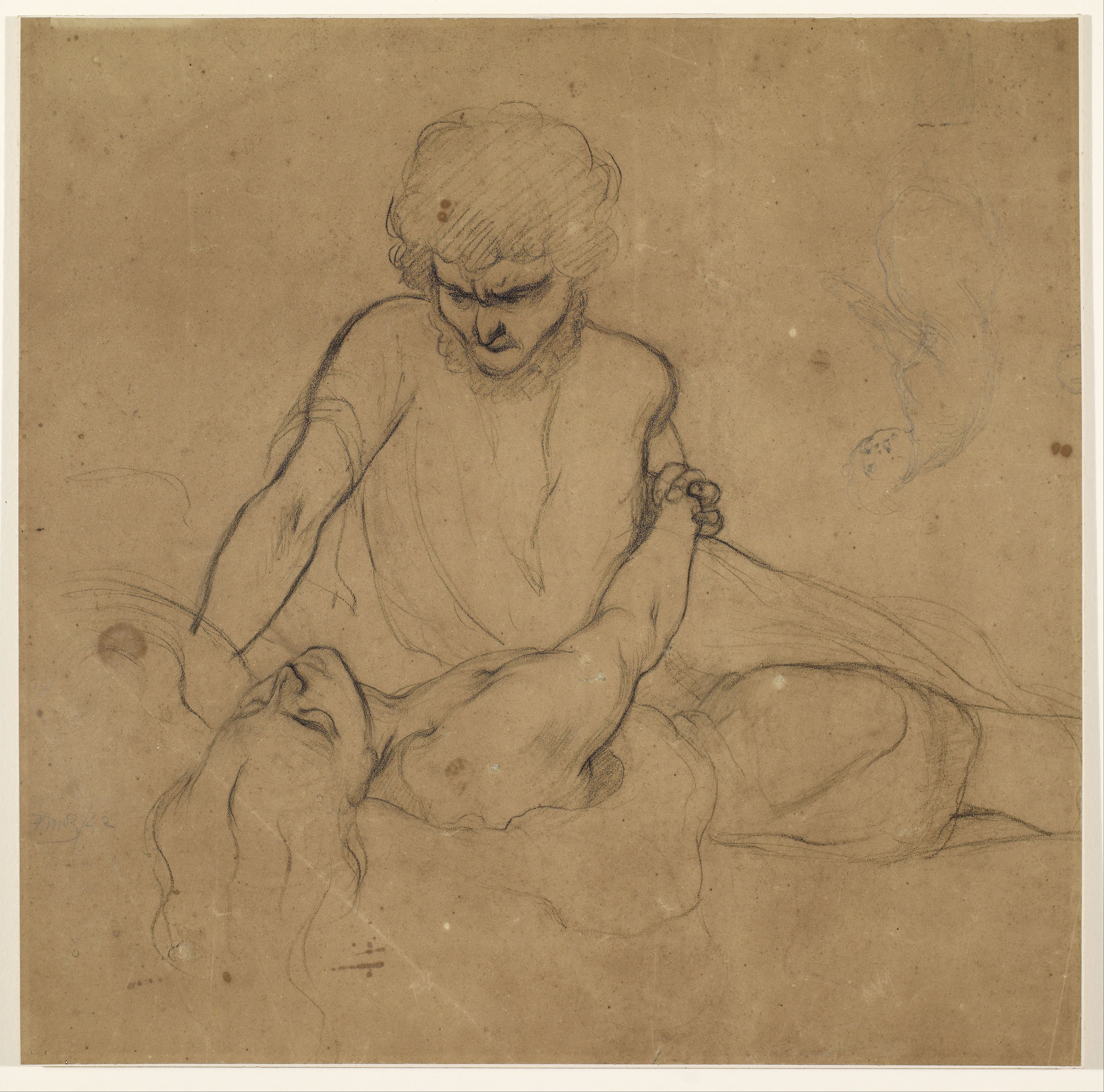
Ford Madox Brown, study for a lost painting of Parisina, 1842, Birmingham Museum and Art Gallery

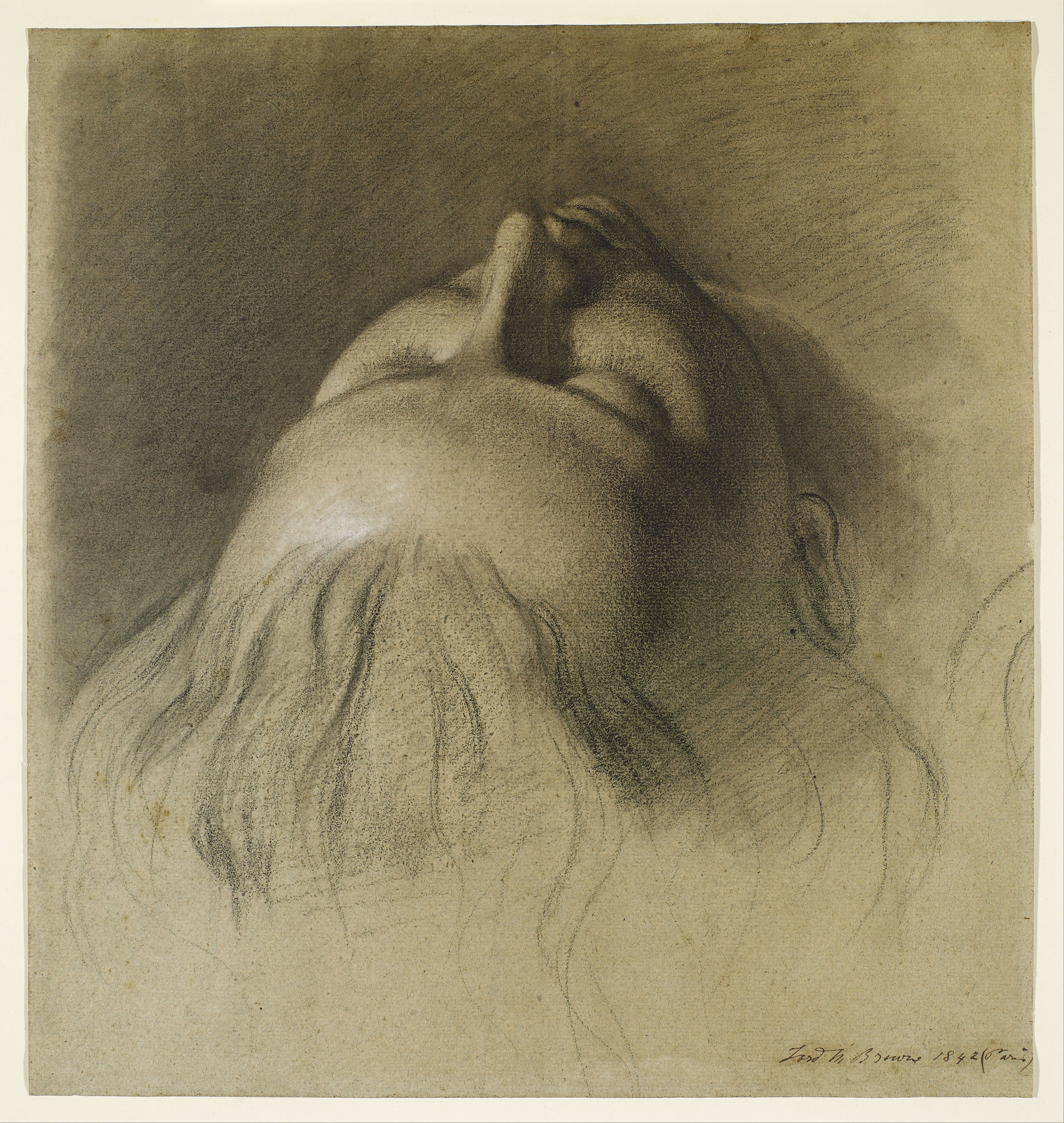
Ford Madox Brown, study for a lost painting of Parisina, 1842, Birmingham Museum and Art Gallery

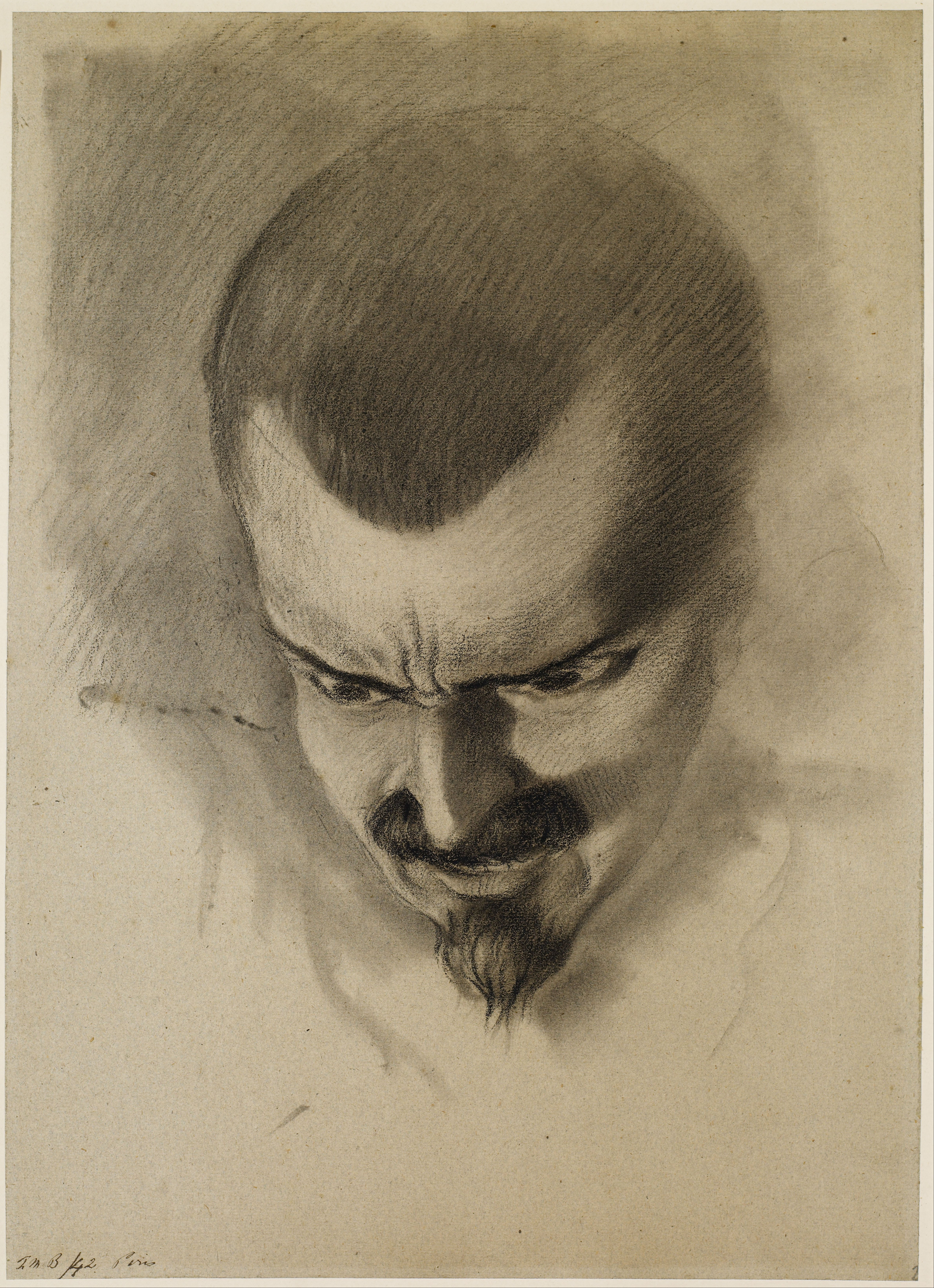
Ford Madox Brown, study for a lost painting of Parisina, 1842, Birmingham Museum and Art Gallery

== Sources ==
- Glass, Loren. “Blood and Affection: The Poetics of Incest in ‘Manfred’ and ‘Parisina.’” Studies in Romanticism, vol. 34, no. 2, 1995, pp. 211–26. JSTOR, https://doi.org/10.2307/25601113. Accessed 26 Jan. 2026.
- Minta, Stephen. "Parisina et Darkness by Lord Byron". The Byron Journal. Liverpool University Press, Volume 41, Number 2, 2013, pp. 197-199.
- Graham, Peter W. "Parisina, Mazeppa and Anglo-Italian displacement in Byron and Italy." 15 December 2017. In Byron and Italy. by Rawes, Alan and Diego Saglia, eds. Manchester University Press, 2020. Chapter DOI: https://doi.org/10.7765/9781526126078.00014.
- Stevenson, Lionel. "'My Last Duchess' and Parisina. Modern Language Notes, Vol. 74, No. 6 (Jun., 1959), pp. 489-492. The Johns Hopkins University Press.
- Pal-Lapinski, Piya. "From Risorgimento to fascism: The politics of Parisina." In Byron: The Poetry of Politics and the Politics of Poetry. Beaton, Roderick and Christine Kenyon Jones, eds. Routledge, 2016.
