= Parisina (Mascagni) =

Opera by Pietro Mascagni

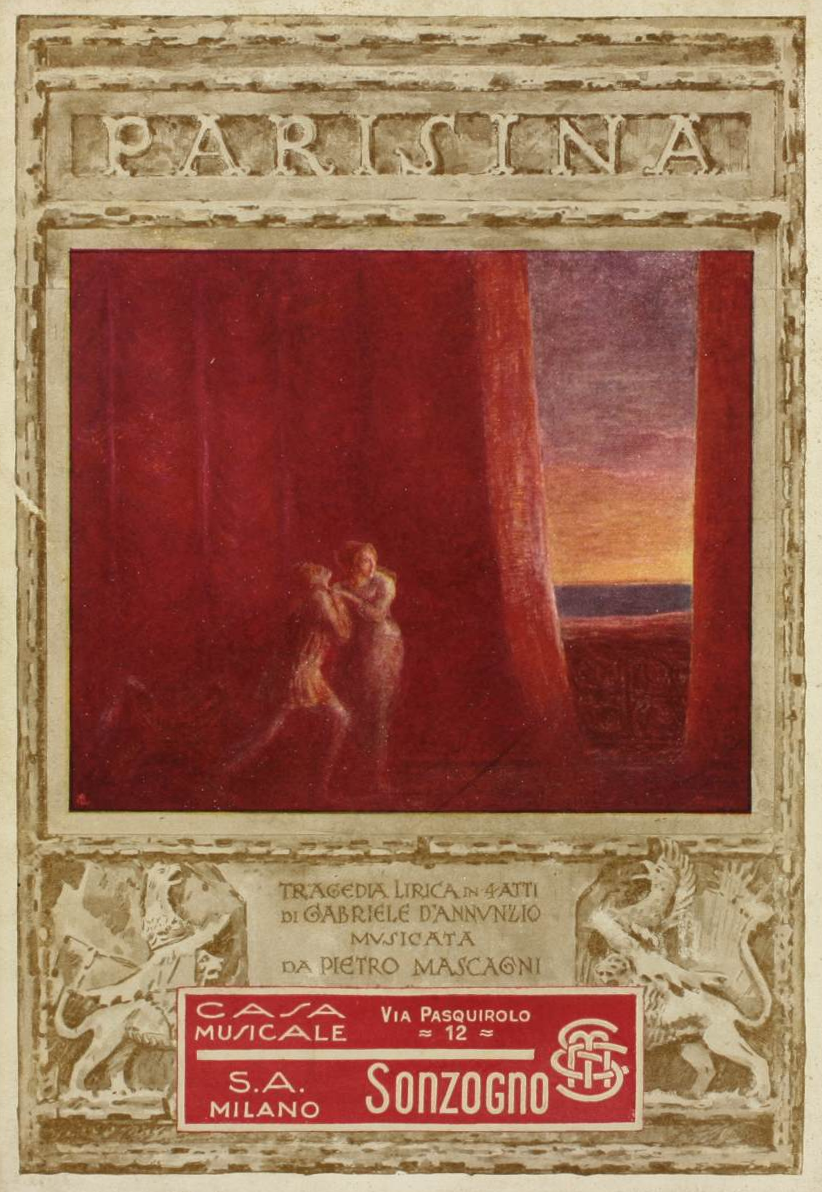
Title page of the libretto, 1913

Parisina is a tragedia lirica, or opera, in four acts by Pietro Mascagni. Gabriele D'Annunzio wrote the Italian libretto after Byron's poem Parisina of 1816.

It was first performed at the Teatro alla Scala in Milan on 15 December 1913.

== Mascagni's career ==
Mascagni (b. Livorno, 7 Dec 1863; d. Rome, 2 Aug 1945) achieved success early on in his compositional life with one of his most famous operas, Cavalleria Rusticana. With this opera he overcame at least 70 rival composers to win the Sonzogno competition in 1888. The ensuing fame encouraged a prolific career remembered for the vibrant melodies first heard in Cavalleria. Indeed, Mascagni was also well known abroad. In England he conducted his own operas in the Royal Opera House's 1892 Italian season n London.

He also embarked on a tour of North America in 1902 returning the following year. His prolific compositional career seemed to exhaust his inventiveness a little and several of his premieres were widely criticised by the public and critics alike. Most notably Le maschere which was premiered simultaneously in seven theatres across Italy, the only success being in Rome where Mascagni himself was conducting.

== Composition history ==
In a bid to regain his previous success Mascagni produced Parisina with the help of the librettist Gabriele D’Annunzio who adapted Byron's 1816 poem of the same title. The composer was drawn to the libretto, which was initially meant to be the second part of a trilogy. The first was Francesca da Rimini and the third was to be Sigismondo, which was never even started. The powerful tragic atmosphere and the brilliance of D’Annunzio to create convincing characters was what appealed to Mascagni.

Within a month of D’Annunzio finishing the libretto Mascagni had begun composing the opera, such was his enthusiasm for the project. His only expressed concern was that of the length of the work. He adored the "transparent simplicity" of the "ringing, melodious verses" which "set his mind on fire" and made his "pulses throb." The creative juices were somewhat stifled when his wife found out about an affair with Anna Lolli and forced him to leave. On his return though he made great progress and finished the opera at the beginning of February 1913 (just 11 months after the libretto was completed). The roles created in Parisina were very demanding both vocally and emotionally. The sweeping phrases are dramatic and accompanied often by equally emotive accompaniment in the orchestra. The swift changes of mood and character are effective and the declamato-arioso style is achieved with brilliance.

== Reception ==
Mascagni's fear of the length of the opera was well founded. The opera, in four acts, lasted 3 hours and 40 minutes, which was far too long for the Italian public and critics. The length was condemned by Giovanni Pozza, the most influential Italian critic, in his comment on the first performance. After mentioning the numerous qualities in the work he wrote:

Inordinate length: if this flaw is not set to rights, it could only weigh down on Parisina’s sound. Independent of any judgement on the intrinsic value of the new opera, the Maestro’s most fanatic advocate must express one hope: cut, cut, cut!

This last statement has subsequently been indefinitely linked with Parisina, which is rarely revived but when it is, the fourth act, which (according to Stivender and others) contains the best music, is generally restored.

== Roles ==
| Role | Voice type | Premiere cast, 15 December 1913 (Conductor: - ) |
|---|---|---|
| Parisina Malatesta | soprano | Tina Poli-Randaccio |
| Ugo d'Este | tenor | Hipólito Lázaro |
| Stella dell'Assassino | mezzo-soprano | Luisa Garibaldi |
| Nicolò d'Este | baritone | Carlo Galeffi |
| Aldobrandino dei Rangoni | bass | |
| La Verde | mezzo-soprano | |

== Synopsis (three-act version) ==
=== Act 1 ===
In the villa of Marquis Nicolo d’Este.

The Marquis' son, Ugo, is interrupted by his mother Stella dell’Assassino in the middle of an archery session. Stella, who has recently been replaced by Parisina Malatesta as the matriarch in the family home, is out for vengeance. Assuming that her son is in the same mindset she urges him to do her dirty work.

=== Act 2 ===
In the Loreto sanctuary.

Devotional songs are heard from the sanctuary and from sailors on the Adriatic. Parisina prepares to offer the Virgin her most elegant piece of clothing. A friend of Ugo d’Este (Aldobrandino) appears to declare that Ugo is close to a victory over the Esclavons. On his return, his stepmother leads him to the sanctuary to kneel together. Ugo gives his sword as an offering to the Virgin. Ugo, bloody and exhausted from battle, stains Parisina's tunic during an embrace. Overjoyed from his victory, he is carried away by his emotions and they kiss amidst the songs of devotion heard before his arrival.

=== Act 3 ===
In the Belfiore palace.

Parisina becomes mad with worry after confusing the book she is reading with reality. In the book, Francesca da Rimini is discovered with another man, by her husband. Ugo enters and the couple greet each other. Suddenly Parisina's maid La Verde bursts in to announce the return of Nicolo d’Este from his hunting trip. The Marquis discovers his own son in flagrante with his mistress and condemns them both to be beheaded.
