= Gilda dalla Rizza =

Italian soprano (1892–1975)

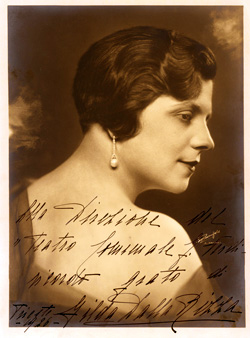
Rizza c. 1917

Gilda Dalla Rizza (12 October 1892 – 5 July 1975) was an important Italian soprano.

Born in Verona, she made her operatic debut in Bologna (the Teatro Verdi) in 1912, as Charlotte in Werther. Especially acclaimed in the verismo repertory, she was regarded as being Giacomo Puccini's favorite soprano, creating Magda in his La rondine (1917). Although he composed the part of Minnie in La fanciulla del West for another soprano, when Puccini saw Dalla Rizza in the part, he said, "Behold, at last I have seen my Fanciulla". She also gave the first European performances of his Suor Angelica and Gianni Schicchi, at Rome in 1919, in the presence of Victor Emmanuel III, King of Italy. He also had her in mind for Liù in Turandot, though her voice proved too heavy for the part of the young slave-girl by the time of the premiere.

Dalla Rizza appeared at the major theatres in Rome, Florence, Turin, São Paulo, Buenos Aires (Teatro Colón), Rio de Janeiro, Verona, Naples, Monte-Carlo, Bologna, Lima, Parma, Santiago, Barcelona, Amsterdam, etc. She never appeared in the United States.

== Repertoire ==
Included in her repertoire were the soprano roles in La fanciulla del West, La forza del destino, Isabeau, Manon Lescaut, La bohème (as Mimì, opposite Enrico Caruso), La damnation de Faust, Lohengrin, Parisina, Mefistofele (with Feodor Chaliapin), Pagliacci, Iris (with Beniamino Gigli), Der Rosenkavalier (as Octavian, opposite Rosa Raïsa and Amelita Galli-Curci), Cavalleria rusticana, Le prince Igor, Andrea Chénier, Die Meistersinger, Tosca, Siberia, La rondine (with Tito Schipa), Lodoletta, Manon, Falstaff, Suor Angelica, Gianni Schicchi, L'amore dei tre re, Madama Butterfly, Otello, Francesca da Rimini, Il piccolo Marat (world premiere at Rome, 1921, with Hipólito Lázaro), Giulietta e Romeo (world premiere at Rome, 1922), Louise, La traviata, Thaïs, Fedora, Turandot (the title role), Luisa Miller, La vida breve, Adriana Lecouvreur, Arabella (the Italian premiere, 1936, conducted by Richard Strauss), etc. She also sang the soprano solo of Beethoven's Ninth Symphony.

== La Scala and Covent Garden ==
At the Teatro alla Scala, from 1915 to 1934, the soprano appeared in Le prince Igor, Andrea Chénier, Isabeau, Siberia, Tosca (directed by Giovacchino Forzano), La traviata (conducted by Arturo Toscanini), Manon Lescaut, Falstaff (with Mariano Stabile), Louise, Francesca da Rimini (with Aureliano Pertile as Paolo), La fanciulla del West, L'amore dei tre re (conducted by Victor de Sabata), Madama Butterfly, La vida breve (Italian premiere, 1934), etc.

Dalla Rizza appeared, in 1920, at Covent Garden, in Manon Lescaut, Madama Butterfly, La bohème, Suor Angelica, Gianni Schicchi, and Tosca.

== Farewell ==
Gilda Dalla Rizza on the cover of Ariel - Musical Culture Magazine

The singing-actress bade farewell to the stage in 1939, though she returned for a final Suor Angelica, at Vicenza in 1942.

In 1926, she married the tenor Agostino Capuzzo (who died in 1963), and, from 1939 to 1955, she taught at Venice's Conservatorio Benedetto Marcello. The prima donna died at Milan's Casa Verdi in 1975.

From 1913 to 1928, Dalla Rizza made several recordings, for Columbia and Fonotipia, of excerpts from Faust, I lombardi, La forza del destino, La traviata, Mefistofele, Otello, Andrea Chénier, Isabeau, Cavalleria rusticana, Madama Butterfly, Manon Lescaut, Gianni Schicchi, Tosca, and Manon. In 1931, for Columbia, she participated in the first recording of Fedora. She is heard in Volume II of EMI's The Record of Singing, in the excerpt from Isabeau.

The tenor Giacomo Lauri-Volpi wrote of her in Voci parallele (1955): "The voice, characterised by guttural and nasal inflexions, imperfect technically, responded to the demands made of it by the actress, who employed it rather to express the emotions than for purely musical effects."

== Bibliography ==
- Le grandi voci, edited by Rodolfo Celletti (with discography by Raffaele Vegeto), Istituto per la collaborazione culturale - Roma, 1964.
- Gilda Dalla Rizza: Verismo e Bel Canto, by F.G. Rizzi, TC, 1964.
- The Last Prima Donnas, by Lanfranco Rasponi, Alfred A. Knopf, 1982. ISBN 978-0-394-52153-4
- Gilda Dalla Rizza: La cantante prediletta di Giacomo Puccini, by Paolo Badoer, Piovan Editore - Abano Terme, 1991.
