= Hipólito Lázaro =

Spanish opera singer (1887–1974)

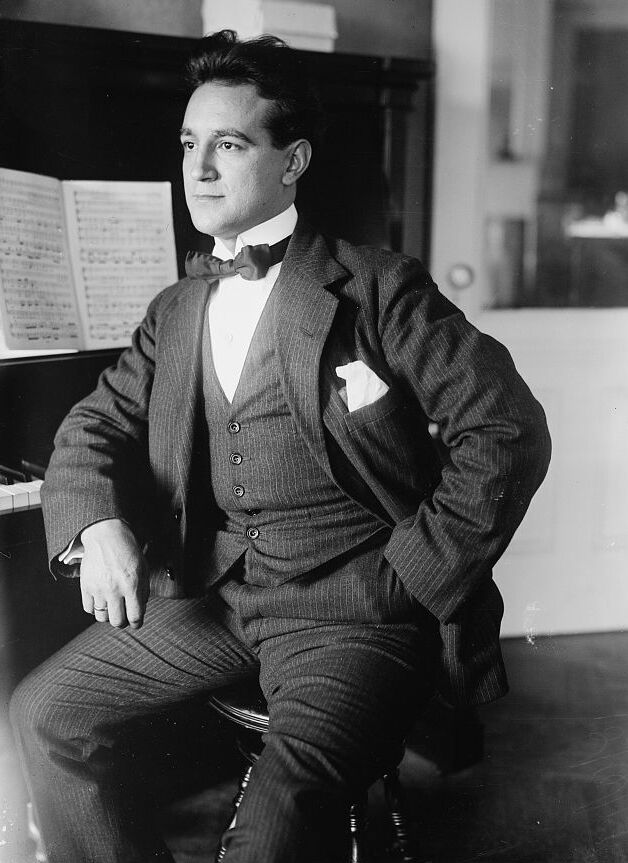
- Lazaro in 1917
- Born: Hipòlit Lázaro; September 13, 1887; Barcelona, Kingdom of Spain
- Died: May 14, 1974 (aged 86); Barcelona, Spain
- Occupation: Opera singer
- Years active: 1910–1950

Hipòlit Lázaro (September 13, 1887 – May 14, 1974), better known as Hipólito Lázaro, was a Catalan-Spanish opera singer. He was active as an operatic tenor for four decades from 1910 through 1950.

== Biography ==
Lázaro was born in Barcelona, Spain on September 13, 1887.

He made his professional debut in 1910 at Teatre Novedades in Barcelona in La favorite. His Italian debut occurred in late 1910 in Rigoletto at the Teatro Tosi-Borghi in Ferrara. During the summer of 1911, he appeared under the pseudonym Antonio Manuele in a series of concerts held in England.

Lázaro built his career primarily on verismo roles, Verdi operas. He performed in Rigoletto, Aida, and Il trovatore, Bizet's Carmen, some bel canto roles such as La favorite, I puritani, and Les Huguenots and Spanish zarzuela (Arrieta's Marina, in particular). He created the tenor roles in Mascagni's Parisina (1913, La Scala) and Il piccolo Marat (1921, Costanzi), and Romani's Fedra (1915, Costanzi). While in Philadelphia in 1924, he received a letter from Umberto Giordano, asking him to create the tenor role in his next opera, La cena delle beffe. The opera's premiere was held in December 1924 at La Scala under the baton of Toscanini.

The second part of Lázaro's career, stretching from the mid-1920s to his final appearances in 1950, consisted of concerts and performances in Spain, Paris, and Italy. He also made various trips to South America, where he was very popular, especially in Cuba.

His repertoire became narrower and narrower from the 1930s onwards, and his voice showed clear signs of decline. Nonetheless, he conserved some of his glory and acclaim through his zarzuela performances. During the 1930s he starred in the zarzuelas, Curro Vargas, Doña Francisquita, La Tempestad, and the Spanish operas, Bretón's La Dolores (1895), Vives' Euda d'Uriach (1934) and Gaig's El estudiante de Salamanca (1935). He officially retired from the stage in 1940, but continued to give occasional performances thereafter.

Lázaro's last performance was in Havana, Cuba in 1950 with the Marina, Aida and Rigoletto. After his retirement, he wrote two books: his autobiography, El libro de mi vida (1968, The book of my life), and Mi método de canto (1947, My singing method), a didactical work for student tenors.

He died 24 years after his last performances on May 14, 1974, in his native Barcelona. He was 87.

== Legacy ==
Lázaro had a "wide-ranging, timbred, considerably vibrant, extended, bold, resilient even if slightly guttural voice," according to Paolo Padovan, with a brilliant metallic shine and a passionate approach to singing. When he sang at the Metropolitan Opera House he was overshadowed by Enrico Caruso, to whom he was compared. He also maintained a strong rivalry with Aragonese tenor Miguel Fleta.
