= Carlo Lombardo =

Italian composer

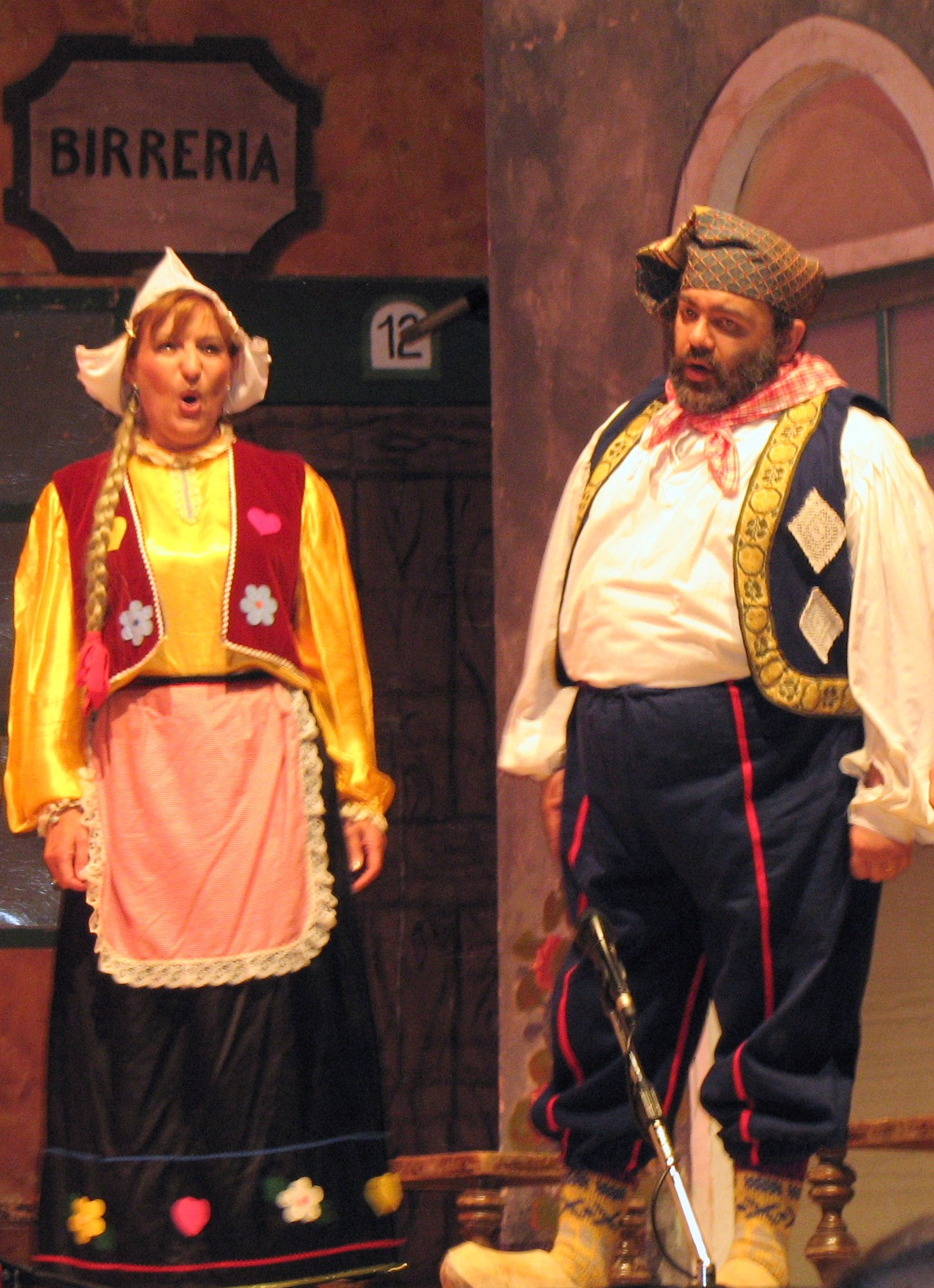
Performance of Il paese dei campanelli

Carlo Lombardo dei Baroni Lombardo di San Chirico (Naples, 28 November 1869 – Milan, 19 December 1959) known also under the composer-pseudonyms Léon Bard, Leo Bard, Leblanc and M. Fernandez, was an Italian operetta impresario, comedian, librettist, publisher and "composer" of pasticcio productions of other composers' music. He is regarded in Italy as the father of the late 19th and early 20th Century revival in Italian operetta.

Lombardo was responsible, in a somewhat debatable manner, for getting Pietro Mascagni to write the operetta Sì. His brother was the conductor and composer Costantino Lombardo. His publishing house, Lombardo Editore, continues to publish sheet music for operettas.

== Operettas and pasticcios ==
- La Regina del Fonografo (The Queen of the Phonograph), music Carlo Lombardo (Leon Bard), libretto Carlo Lombardo e Gil Blas, ca. 1915
- La duchessa del Bal Tabarin, 1917
- Madama di Tebe, libretto and music by Lombardo, Milan, 7 March 1918
- Sì, music by Pietro Mascagni, Rome, Teatro Quirino, 13 December 1919
- Il re di Chez-Maxim, music Mario Pasquale Costa, 1919
- La danza delle libellule, music by Franz Lehár and Carlo Lombardo, Milan 3 May 1922
- Scugnizza, music Mario Pasquale Costa, Turin, 16 December 1922
- Il paese dei campanelli, music Virgilio Ranzato and Carlo Lombardo, Milan, Teatro Lirico, 23 November 1923
- Cin Ci La, music Virgilio Ranzato, Milan, 18 December 1925
- La casa innamorata, libretto Renato Simoni 1929

== Recordings ==
- La duquesa de Bal Tabarin – Spanish zarzuela version of the Italian operetta – Elsa del Campo, Tomás Álvarez, Dolores Pérez, Santiago Ramalle, Coros de Radio Nacional de España, Orquesta de Cámara de Madrid, Enrique Estela, director
