= The Country of the Campanelli =

1954 Italian-French comedy film by Jean Boyer

- Directed by: Jean Boyer
- Written by: Jean Boyer; Sandro Continenza; Gian Giacomo Cossa; Italo De Tuddo; Virgilio Ranzato
- Story by: Carlo Lombardo
- Produced by: Giuseppe Barbaro; Luigi De Laurentiis
- Starring: Sophia Loren; Carlo Dapporto
- Cinematography: Luciano Trasatti
- Edited by: Gisa Radicchi Levi
- Music by: Felice Montagnini
- Production companies: Alba Film; Valentia Film
- Distributed by: CEI Incom; L'Union des Producteurs de Films
- Release date: 28 January 1954
- Running time: 90 minutes
- Countries: France; Italy
- Language: Italian

The Country of the Campanelli (Italian: Il paese dei campanelli, French: Ces voyous d'hommes, also known as Town of Bells) is a 1954 Italian-French comedy film directed by Jean Boyer and starring Sophia Loren. It is loosely based on the operetta "Il paese dei campanelli" by Carlo Lombardo. The film's sets were designed by the art director Piero Filippone.

== Plot ==
A fraudulent travelling magician convinces the inhabitants of a town that they can make the bells ring whenever someone is unfaithful to another.

== Cast ==
- Sophia Loren as Bonbon
- Carlo Dapporto as Lt. La Gaffe
- Mario Riva as Tarquinio the Magician
- Alda Mangini as Tenerina
- Luisella Beghi as Candida
- Sergio Tofano as Dr. Pott
- Achille Togliani as René
- Giuseppe Addobbati as Tom
- Rosita Pisano as Annie
- Alberto Talegalli as Bruto
- Charles Fawcett as Admiral
- Diana Dei as Admiral's wife
- Alberto Sorrentino as The Stupid Sailor
- Riccardo Billi
