= Paul de Choudens =

French librettist, musician, and poet (1850–1925)

Paul (de) Choudens, also known under the pseudonym Paul Bérel (5 June 1850 – 7 October 1925), was a French musician, music publisher, poet and librettist.

== Biography ==
Choudens was born in Paris. In 1888, with his brother Antony, he took over the publishing house established by his father Antoine de Choudens in 1845 and made a fortune in publishing in particular, the music scores of Faust by Gounod and Carmen by Bizet. He was a staunch supporter of Alfred Bruneau, Paul Vidal and André Messager.

As a librettist, he translated and adapted Der Schauspieldirektor by Mozart in collaboration with Arthur Bernède with whom he would write five libretti for the composer Félix Fourdrain.

== Libretti ==
- Henri Hirschmann: Lovelace (in collaboration with Jules Barbier)
- Pietro Mascagni: Amica
- Isidore de Lara: Sanga
- Ruggero Leoncavallo: Maïa
- Camille Erlanger: L'Aube rouge
- Albert Dupuis: La Passion
- Xavier Leroux: La Plus forte
- Henry Février: Oletta, la fille du Corse

== Bibliography ==
- Anik Devriès & François Lesure: Dictionnaire des éditeurs de musique français, vol. 2 (Geneva: Minkoff, 1988), p. 107–109.
- Agnès Chauvin: "L'Hôtel Choudens", in: Livraisons d'histoire de l'architecture, no. 18, 2nd semester 2009.
