= Amica (opera) =

Opera by Pietro Mascagni

- Opera by Pietro Mascagni
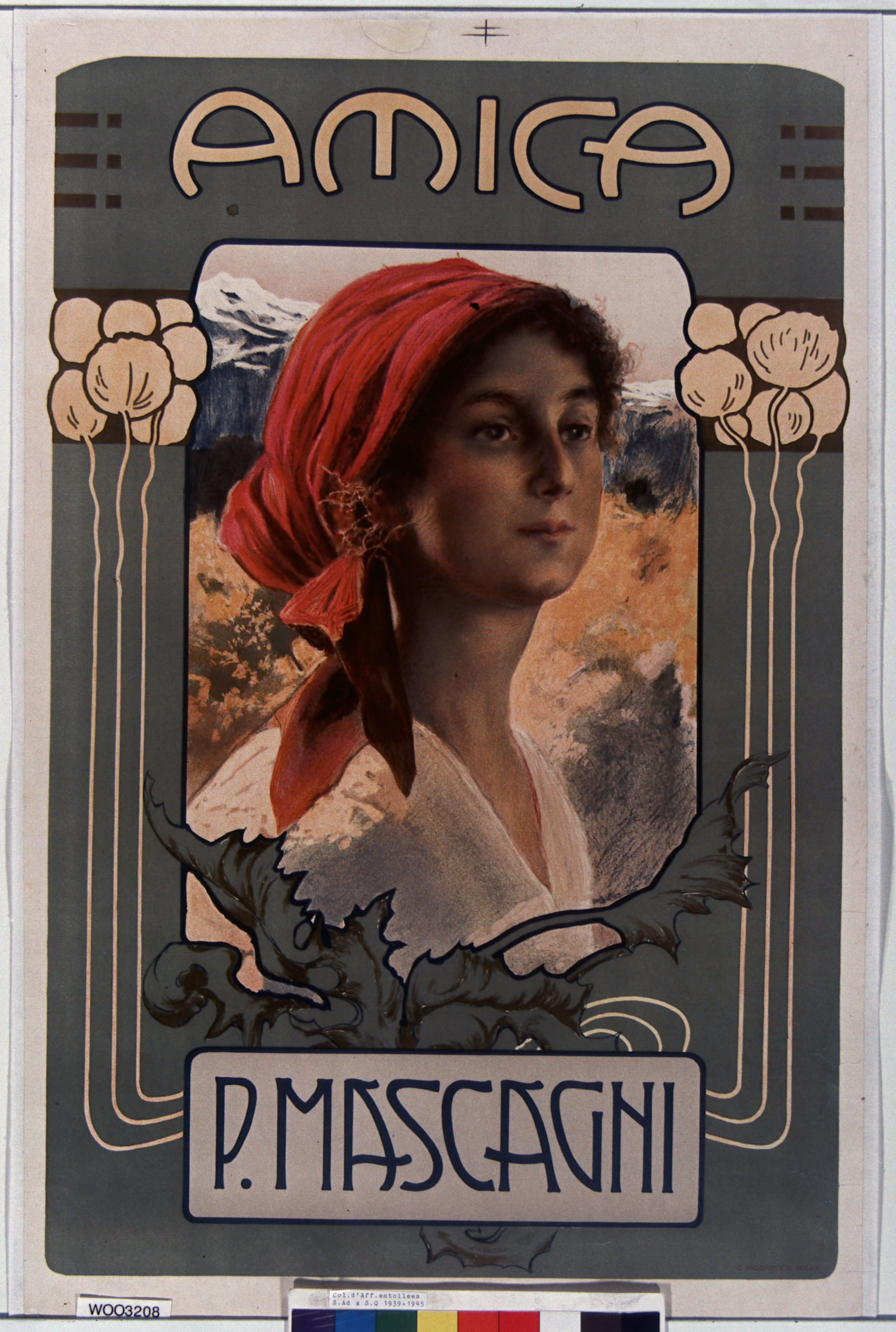
- Poster by Casa Ricordi, 1905
- Librettist: Paul Bérel
- Language: French
- Premiere: 16 March 1905; Théâtre du Casino, Monte-Carlo

Amica is an opera in two acts by Pietro Mascagni, originally composed to a libretto by Paul Bérel (the pseudonym of Paul de Choudens). The only opera by Mascagni with a French libretto, it was an immediate success with both the audience and the critics on its opening night at the Théâtre du Casino in Monte-Carlo on 16 March 1905. Mascagni himself conducted the performance. The opera had its Italian premiere (with an Italian libretto by Mascagni's close collaborator, Giovanni Targioni-Tozzetti) on 13 May 1905 at the Teatro Costanzi in Rome.

However, like many of Mascagni's operas apart from Cavalleria rusticana, the work then fell into obscurity. The first modern recording was in 1995 with Katia Ricciarelli, conducted by Marco Pace. One of its few revivals in modern times was on 4 August 2007 at the Festival della Valle d'Itria, using the original French libretto. (It has been released on CD and DVD.) In October 2008, Opera di Roma used the Italian libretto for a new production of Amica in collaboration with Opéra de Monte-Carlo and the Teatro Carlo Goldoni in Livorno.

Set in the mountains of Savoy around 1900, Amica is a classic verismo drama. It recounts a domestic tragedy involving two brothers (Giorgio and Renaldo) and the woman they both love (Amica).

== Roles ==
Roles, voice types, premiere cast
Role	Voice type	French premiere cast, 16 March 1905 Conductor: Pietro Mascagni	Italian premiere cast, 13 May 1905 Conductor: Pietro Mascagni
Amica	soprano	Geraldine Farrar	Amalia Karola
Giorgio	tenor	Charles Rousselière	Piero Schiavazzi
Renaldo	baritone	Maurice Renaud	Riccardo Stracciari
Père Camoine	bass	Henri-Alexandre Lequien	Leo Eral
Magdelone	soprano	Paola Rainaldi	Italia Bonetti

== Recordings ==
- In Italian: Katia Ricciarelli, Fabio Armiliato, Walter Donati, Elia Padovan, Hungarian Radio and Television Symphony Orchestra & Chorus. Conductor: Marco Pace. Released 1996. Kicco Classic 00296
- In the original French: Anna Malavasi, David Sotgiu, Pierluigi Dilengite, Marcello Rosiello, Francesca De Giorgi, Festival della Valle d'Itria, Orchestra Internazionale d'Italia, Bratislava Chamber Choir. Conductor: Manlio Benzi. Digital live recording. Released 2008. CD version: Dynamic CDS 574. DVD version: Dynamic, distributed by Naxos, filmed at the Palazzo Ducale, Martina Franca, Italy, 4–6 August 2007.
