= Il piccolo Marat =

Opera by Pietro Mascagni

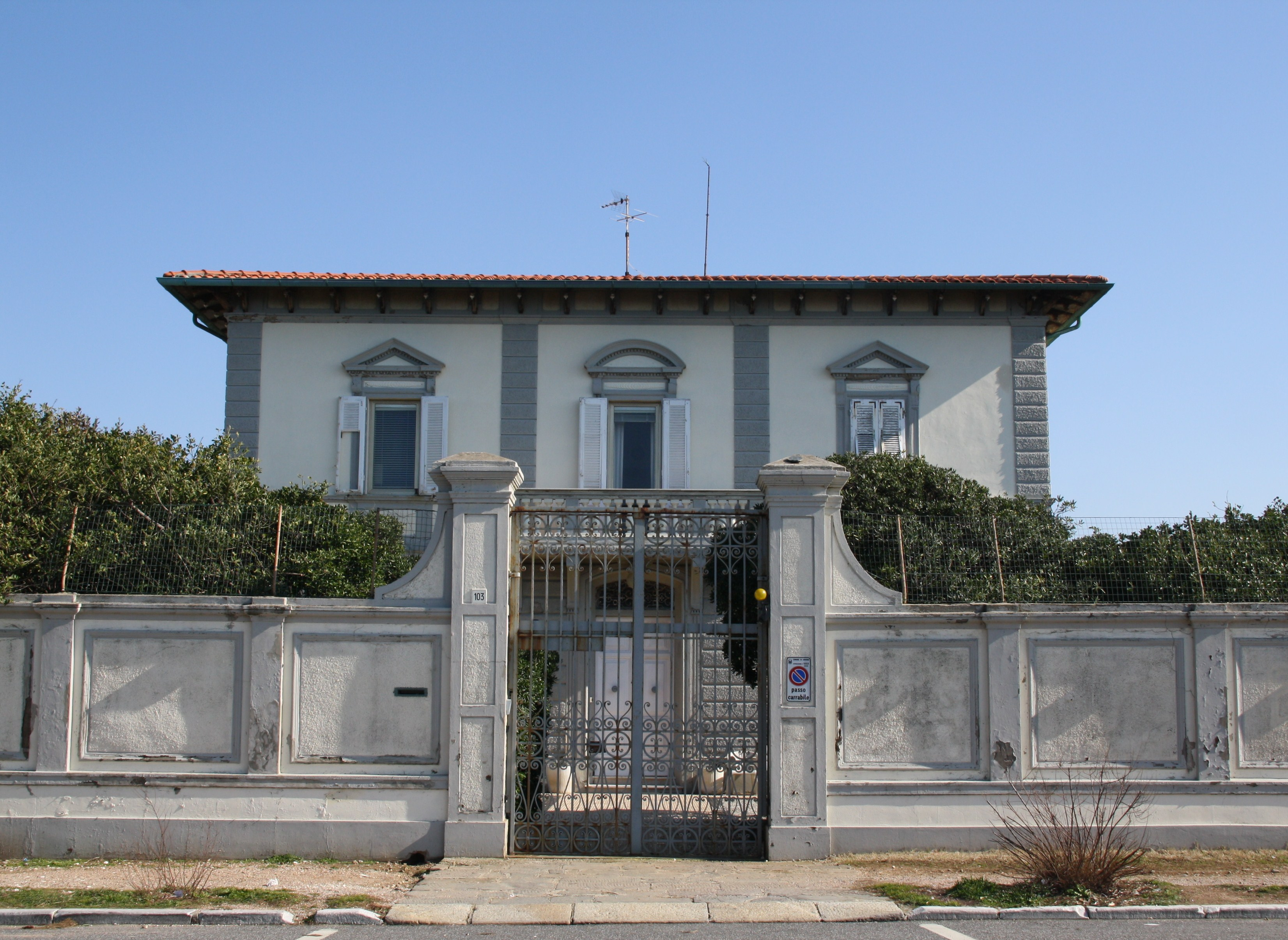
The Villa Mascagni

Il piccolo Marat is a dramma lirico or opera in three acts by the Italian composer Pietro Mascagni from a libretto by Giovacchino Forzano composed when Mascagni lived in Livorno, Italy (in the 1916-built villa shown at the right), where he also composed his opera Lodoletta.

== Performance history ==
The opera was first performed on 2 May 1921 at the Teatro Costanzi, Rome and then many times in Italy and South America, with at least 450 individual performances documented. Though Mascagni was slated to perform the opera in the United States in 1926, logistics proved too difficult for rehearsal, and the North American premiere waited until 13 April 2009, when Teatro Grattacielo performed the opera at Avery Fisher Hall in New York.

== Roles ==
Role	Voice type	Premiere cast, 2 May 1921 (Conductor: Pietro Mascagni)
La Principessa di Fleury (La Mamma)	mezzo-soprano	Agnese Porter
Mariella, (her granddaughter)	soprano	Gilda dalla Rizza
Il piccolo Marat	tenor	Hipólito Lázaro
Il soldato	baritone	Benvenuto Franci
Il carpentiere	baritone	Ernesto Badini
Il Presendente del Comitato: L'Orco	bass	Luigi Ferroni
Il capitano dei «Marats»		Augusto Beuf
La spia		Gino De Vecchi
Il portatore de ordini		Arturo Pellegrino
Il ladro		Michele Fiore
La tigre		Mario Pinheiro
Una voce		Luigi Nardi
I «Marats»		
Gli ussari Americani		
I Prigionieri		
La Folla affamata		

== Synopsis ==
Source: Pietro Mascani: "Il Piccolo Marat" (1921) Libretto"

Time of the Reign of Terror in France.

=== Act One ===
Scene: A small town square. On the left a building with a gallery and stairs, door beneath the gallery - The Committee Building. In the distance a bridge spanning a river. On the right a convent converted to a prison. All is deserted save "an American hussar" who stands guard at the prison.

An autumn evening. The square, the bridge, and the streets are empty. The city is silent. A song passes through the air, sounding as though it comes from the city's prisons.

Suddenly two young people run across the bridge pursued by a large crowd. The youths pass into the square with the crowd yelling they should be detained as thieves.

As the crowd reaches the square The Marats exit the building on the left and prevent the crowd from approaching the Committee Building. Words are exchanged between The Marats and the Crowd who insist the youths "resell contraband." The Captain of the Marats exhorts the crowd to disperse. The Orc himself makes an appearance and speaks with the Crowd.

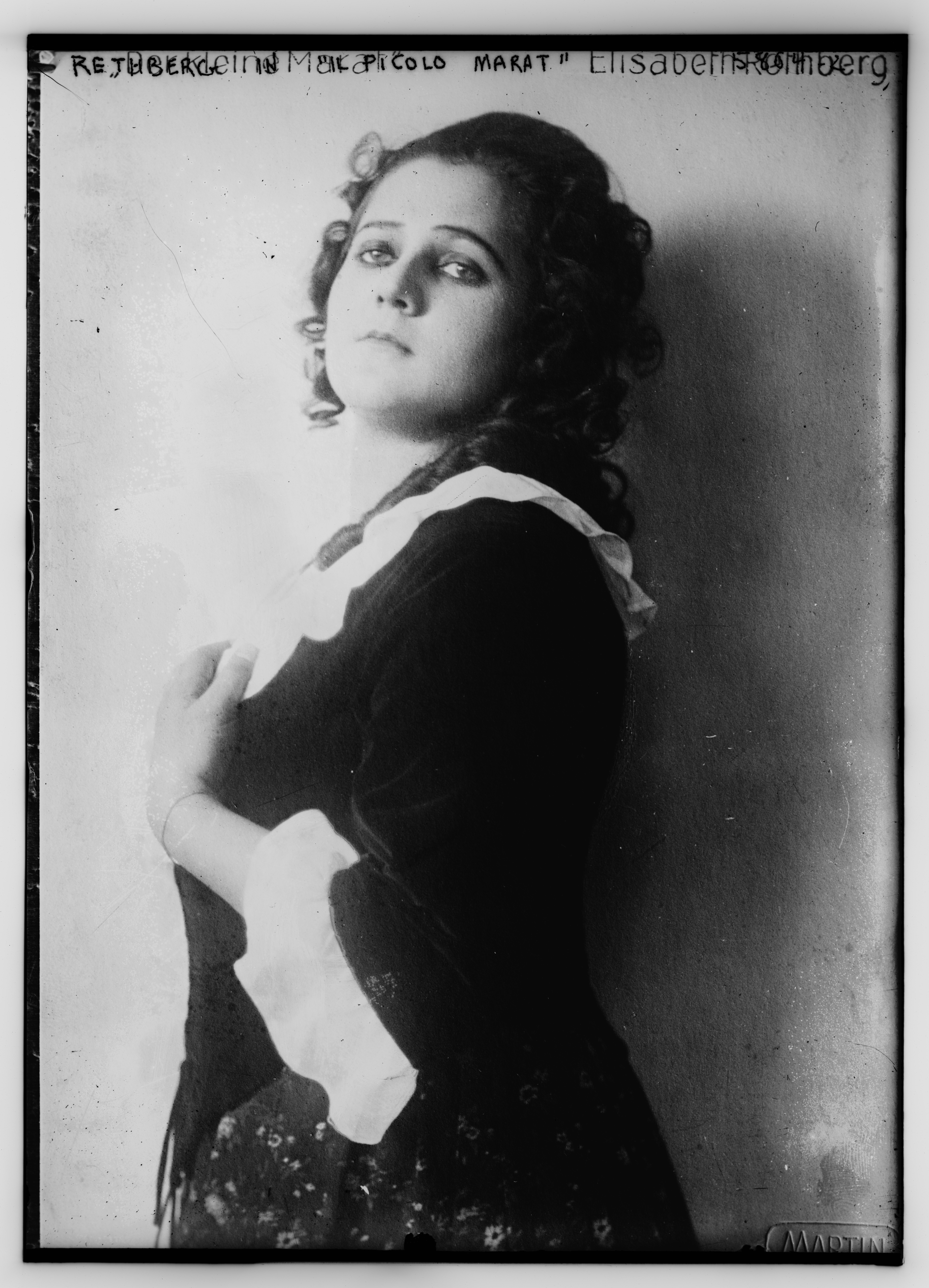
Elisabeth Rethberg in Il Piccolo Marat

When he tells the Crowd to report those who thieve, they respond that two such people are now in the square. The Orc descends to discover his niece Mariella is one of the two youths. She explains that she was bringing the Orc his dinner.

The Crowd insists they must have what's in the basket Mariella carried. The young man with Mariella takes the basket and gives its contents to the Crowd. He then exclaims his sympathy with the Marats and is enlisted in their ranks and begins guard duty. The Young Man becomes The Small Marat.

The Orc has three collaborators, The Spy, The Thief, The Tiger. The Tiger now enters with another "fat, chubby little man", the Carpenter. The Orc and the Tiger discuss plans for the evening which will clear the prison immediately quickly - they will load a boat with prisoners, sail it to sea, then scuttle the boat. The Carpenter shows, despite his great fear, the Orc and the Tiger a model of his boat and how it works. The Orc and his men belittle and humiliate the Carpenter.

A Soldier on horse rides into the square. The Orc addresses the Soldier and invites him into the Committee Building. They exchange hostilities for both believe themselves men of power. The Soldier accuses the Orc of abuse of power. All exit except The Small Marat.

The Small Marat goes to the Prison and confirms that "The Princess of Fleury" is an inmate. She is brought to him and he reveals that she is his Mother. He is now "The Little Prince" and he explains his plan to save her.

The Soldier exits The Committee Building, followed by The Orc and his men, and exits the square. The sound of the voices of Prisoners singing as they embark onto the boat is heard as the act ends.

=== Act Two ===
Scene: The Orcs' house with entrance door, entrance hall, wooden staircase, landing, door to the bedroom, and a dinner table. Some time has passed since Act One.

Mariella sings to herself. The Carpenter comes to visit. He is much changed, "emaciated, ashen, undone." He has come to ask Mariella to intercede on his behalf with her Uncle. They reminisce about what their city once was. The Carpenter confesses that he spies for The Soldier. Mariella reveals a Madonna in a creche hidden behind the Marat portrait on which she swears she'll not betray the Carpenter.

The Small Marat enters. By his actions he shows his affection for Mariella. He asks if The Carpenter has "a boat that goes out to sea." The Carpenter admits he does. The Small Marat arranges for The Carpenter to meet him later for use of the boat.

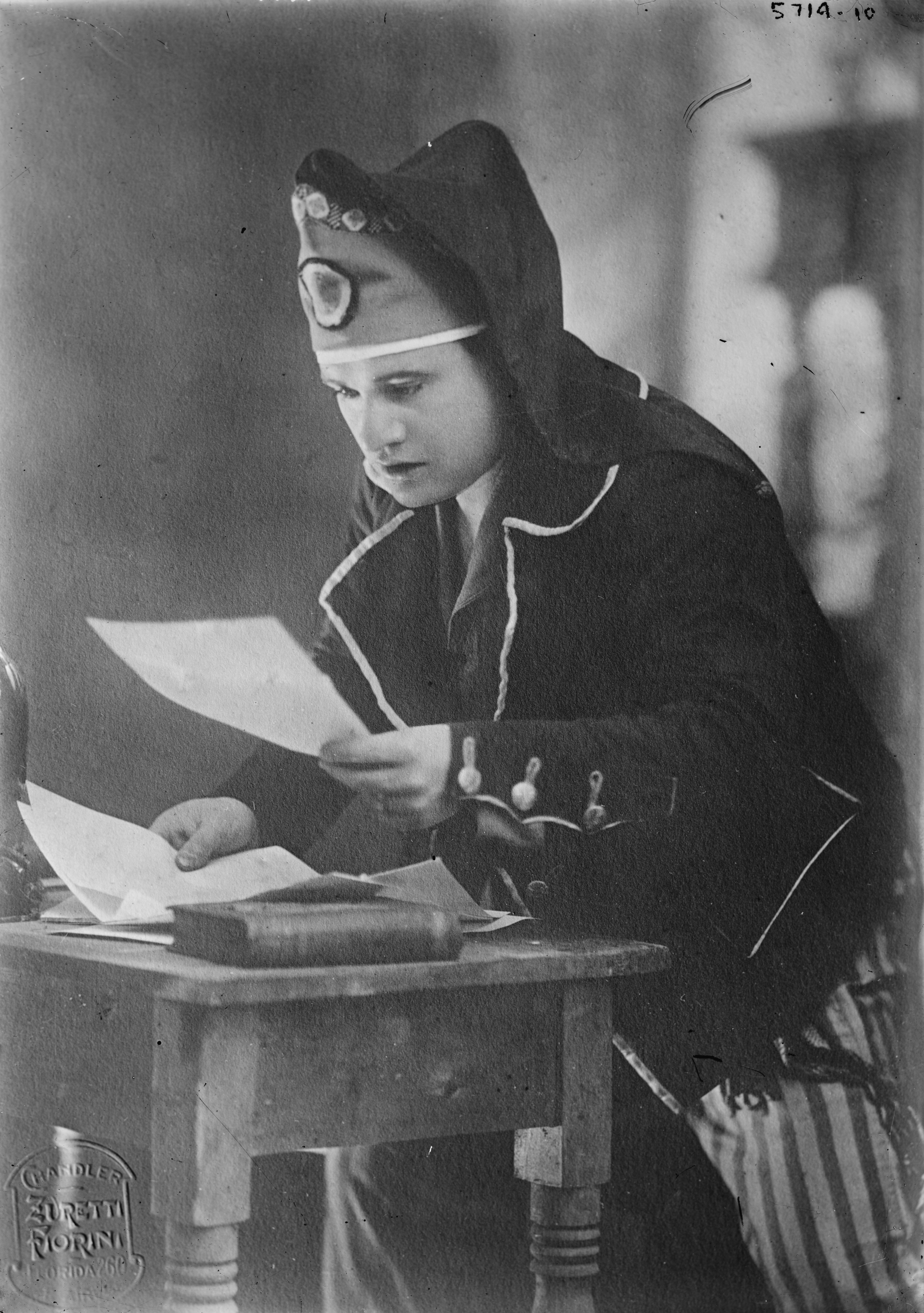
Beniamino Gigli sang in 16 performances.

Enters "The Carrier of Orders" with papers for The Orc. The Small Marat rifles through them and extracts several and puts them in his pocket (the image at left may be the great Italian tenor Beniamino Gigli playing the role of the Small Marat as this moment in the opera

The Orc and his men enter. They extort valuables from a succession of Prisoners who are brought before them. The Orc notices the absence of papers for The Princess Fluery, which makes him angry. The Orc makes to strike her and at her cry The Soldier enters. The Orc reveals he rules by Robespierre's instructions. At this The Soldier makes a fatal mistake by calling Robespierre a tyrant. The Orc bests The Soldier by his boasts to the Crowd who have entered The Committee Building who rush The Soldier, tie him up, and take him to the river to toss him into it. All exit except Mariella and The Small Marat.

The Small Marat now reveals his love for Mariella and precedes to win her over, revealing he is Prince Jean-Charles of Fluery. He enlists her in his scheme to rescue his mother, to which Mariella assents. The two hide in the shadows as The Orc, drunk, returns and climbs the stairs to his bedroom.

=== Act Three ===
Scene: The Orc's bedroom. The room contains some ramshackle furniture mixed with various luxury furnishings scattered here and there, evidently benefited from fruitful "searches" in aristocratic houses.

In the middle of the room, in front of a desk, an armchair. Beside the entrance door, which is on the right, on a table, two solid bronze candelabra. Some tapestries and some carpets.

A large window occupies almost the entire wall at the back. On the left an iron bed, not large. To the right of the bed a cabinet. On the desk, papers and writing materials; papers piled up confusingly.

A patrol of "American Hussars" passes by outside, singing a song. After they have passed, Mariella and The Little Prince enter. They hear a cuckoo, which is The Carpenter's agreed on sign that he is ready with the boat. The two of them wrap ropes around the sleeping man and tie him to his bed.

The Little Prince searches for pen and paper to extort from The Orc a Safe Conduct for himself, Mariella, his Mother, and the Carpenter. The Orc awakes and commences to struggle for his freedom. With dagger in hand, The Little Prince reveals his identity and keeps The Orc restrained.

Mariella forges the Safe Conducts. After a momentary alarm due to outside voices that Mariella relieves by sending the Citizens to a local tavern, Mariella and The Little Prince move to leave. The Orc manages to grab a pistol from under the bedcover and shoots The Little Prince who falls to the ground.

The Orc continues to extricate himself from the ropes while The Little Prince persuades Mariella to escape. She takes the Safe Conduct and leaves. Through the window The Little Prince watches her progress in freeing his Mother from prison and going to the boat.

The Carpenter enters as The Orc frees himself. Seeing that The Orc is free, he grabs the edge of the table covered with bronze candelabra and topples it over onto The Orc. He then grabs a candelabra and kills The Orc with it.

The Carpenter helps The Little Prince to his feet and they exit.

Fin.

== Recordings ==
Several recordings exist of the complete work, the most widely distributed of which features the husband and wife team of Virginia Zeani and Nicola Rossi-Lemeni with tenor Giuseppe Gismondo; this live 1962 recording from San Remo was issued on the Italian Cetra label as a 3-LP set and, later, a 2-CD set. A live concert performance from the Netherlands, 1992, starring Susan Neves and Daniel Galvez-Vallejo, was issued on the Bongiovanni label.

Another recording exists on archive.org with the performing forces at the Teatro Lirico, Livorno, with Giancarlo Boldrini (L'Orco), Regina De Ventura (Mariella), Jesus Pinto (Il piccolo Marat), Fulvia Bertoli (La principessa), Marco Cinghari (Il soldato), Maurizio Picconi (Il carpentiere), Antonio Mantesi (La spia), Enrico Rotoli (Il ladro), Delfo Menicucci (Il Tigre), Maurizio Razzauti (Il portatore di ordini), Luca Stefanini (Il capitano dei Marats), Carlo Messeri (il prigioniero), Direttore Mauro Ceccanti.

Among significant recordings of selections of the opera are Hipólito Lázaro's 1926 recording (with soprano Mafalda de Voltri) of approximately 14 minutes of the opera beginning at "Sei tu? Che cosa vieni a fare?... Va' nella tua stanzetta".
