= Amelia Felle =

Italian opera singer

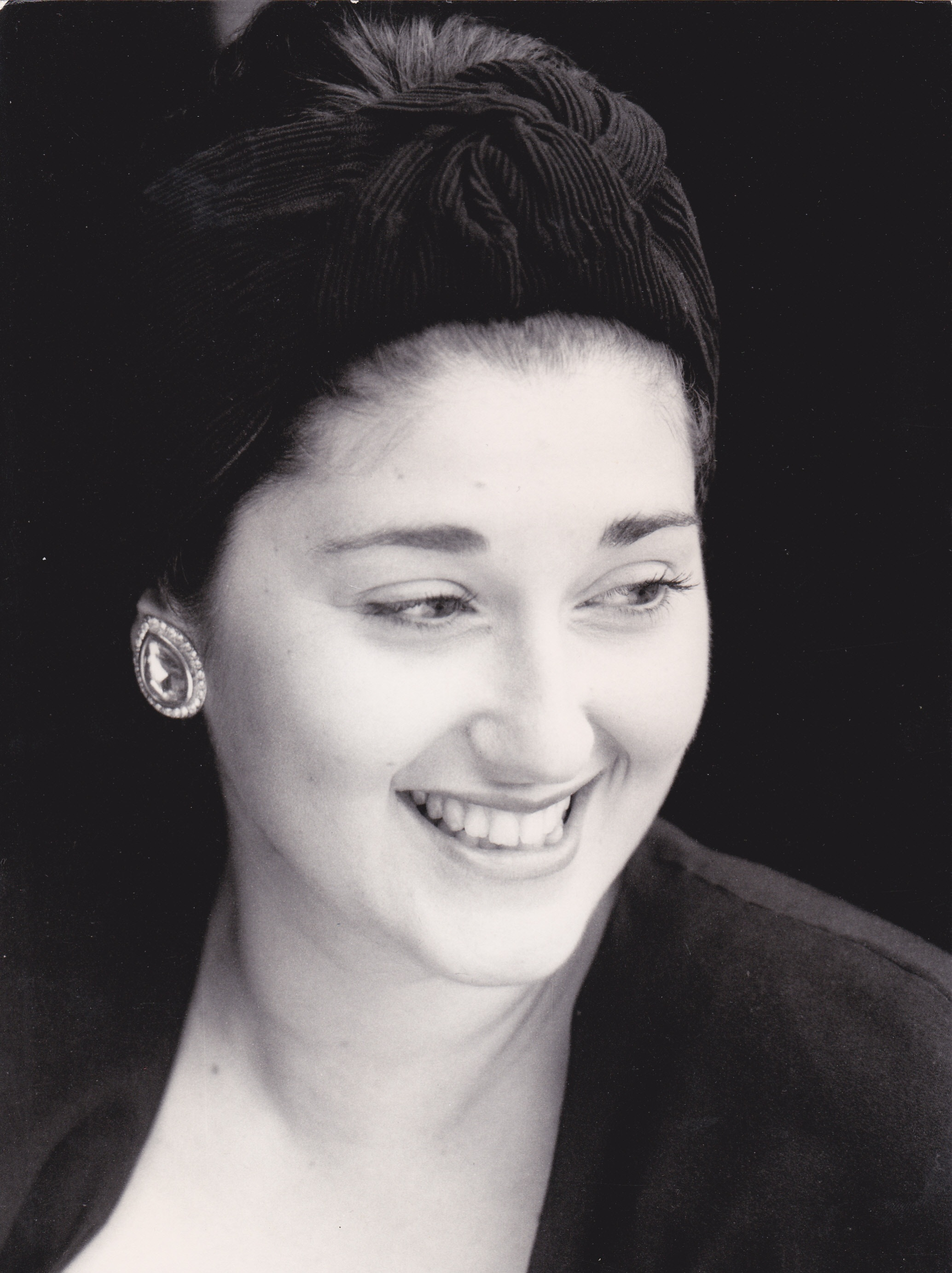
- Born: December 31, 1960 (age 64); Bari, Italy
- Occupations: Opera singer (soprano); Voice teacher
- Years active: 1981–present
- Website: ameliafelle.it

Amelia Felle (31 december 1960) is an Italian operatic soprano and voice teacher. Born in Bari, she has been active on the sta ges of Italian and European opera houses and concert halls since her debut in 1981. She holds the chair in vocal chamber music at the Conservatorio di Santa Cecilia in Rome, a position she previously held at the Conservatorio Tito Schipa in Lecce.

== Biography ==
Felle was born in Bari and received her diplomas in piano and singing from the city's Conservatorio Niccolò Piccinni. At the same time she obtained a diploma in architecture from the Accademia di Belle Arti di Bari. She made her singing debut in Bari in 1981 performing in oratorios by Vivaldi and Pergolesi with the Orchestra Sinfonica della Provincia di Bari. After winning the Concorso Liederistico Internazionale di Finale Ligure and the Voci Nuove per la Lirica competitions in 1984, she made her debut on the opera stage at Teatro Lirico Sperimentale in Spoleto as Adina in L'elisir d'amore and sang again there as Norina in Don Pasquale (1985) and Susanna Le nozze di Figaro directed by Gigi Proietti (1986).

She went on to make her house debuts at the Teatro San Carlo as Sofia in Il signor Bruschino (1986), La Fenice as Musetta in La bohème (1987), and La Scala as Jemmy in Guillaume Tell (1988). In the first years of her career she sang primarily in operas by Donizetti, Rossini, and Mozart but she also appeared in two rarely performed Mascagni operas, Le maschere (as Colombina) and Sì (as Vera), as well as singing Nena in La Scala's first performance of Pergolesi's Lo frate 'nnamorato. Her later Verdian roles included Amelia in Ballo in maschera, the title role of Aida, Elvira in Ernani, Elisabetta in Don Carlo, Lucrezia in I due Foscari, and Amelia in Simon Boccanegra.

In the early 2000s Felle left the opera stage and has since concentrated on the vocal chamber music repertoire. For over 20 years she has been a professor of singing in parallel with her performance career. She is professor of vocal chamber music at the Conservatorio Santa Cecilia in Rome, a post she previously held at the Conservatorio Tito Schipa in Lecce, and has taught courses and master classes for the universities of Barcelona, Weimar, Leipzig, Dublin, Karlsruhe, Palma de Mallorca, Istanbul, and Malta amongst others.

== Discography ==
- Rossini: William Tell – Zancanaro/Merrit/Studer/Felle/D'Intino/Roni; Orchestra del Teatro alla Scala, Riccardo Muti (conductor); 2006 Decca Classics, CD (recorded live in 1988 at Teatro alla Scala)
- Rossini: Il barbiere di Siviglia – Hadley/Praticò/Mentzer/Hampson/Ramey/Felle/Fardilha/Utzeri; Orchestra della Toscana, Gianluigi Gelmetti (conductor); 2003 EMI Classics, CD (recorded in 1993 at the Chiesa di S. Stefano, Florence).
- Rossini: L'inganno felice – De Carolis/Felle/Zennaro/Previati/Serraioco; English Chamber Orchestra, Marcello Viotti (conductor); 1996 Claves, CD (recorded in 1992 at the Rosslyn Hill Chapel, London)
- Lorenzo Ferrero: Mare nostro – Felle/Jankovic/Rigosa/Di Segni/Antoniozzi/Serraiocco; Orchestra of the Teatro Sociale di Rovigo, Gianfranco Masini (conductor); 1999 Ricordi, CD (recorded in 1991 at the Teatro Sociale di Rovigo)
- Mascagni: Le maschere – Felle/Gallego/La Scola; Orchestra and Chorus of the Teatro Comunale di Bologna, Gianluigi Gelmetti (conductor); 1990 Warner Fonit, CD (recorded in 1988 at the Teatro Comunale di Bologna)
- Mascagni: Sì – Vivian/Felle/Nicoletti/Gentile/Comas/Liguori; Orchestra Sinfonica del Cantiere Internazionale d'Arte, Sandro Sanna (conductor); 1987 Bongiovanni, CD (recorded live in 1987 at the Teatro poliziano de Montepulciano)
- Pergolesi: Lo frate 'nnamorato - Corbelli/Felle/Focile/D'Intino; Orchestra del Teatro alla Scala, Riccardo Muti (conductor); 1992 Opus Arte, DVD (recorded live in 1989 at Teatro alla Scala)
- Rossini: Il signor Bruschino – Corbelli/Felle/Kuebler/Rinaldi; Stuttgart Radio Symphony Orchestra, Gianluigi Gelmetti (conductor); 2006 Euro Arts, DVD (recorded in 1989 at the Schlosstheater Schwetzingen)
- Rossini: La cambiale di matrimonio – Del Carlo/Hall/Kuebler/Rinaldi/Feller/Felle; Stuttgart Radio Symphony Orchestra, Gianluigi Gelmetti (conductor); 2006 Euro Arts, DVD (recorded in 1989 at the Schlosstheater Schwetzingen)
