= Virgilio Ranzato =

Italian composer and violinist

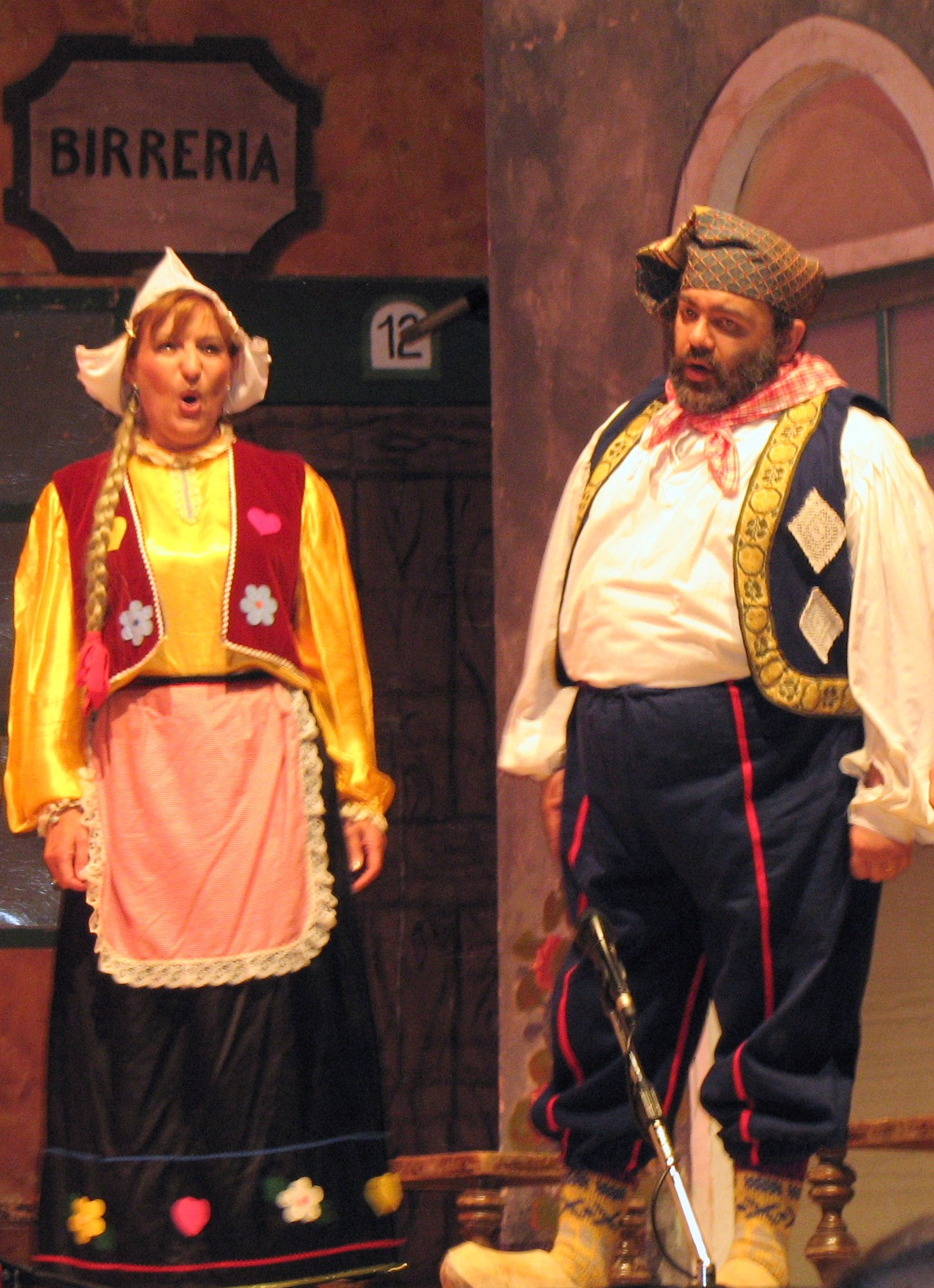
A performance of Il paese dei campanelli

Virgilio Ranzato (May 7, 1882 in Venice – April 20, 1937 in Como) was an Italian composer and violinist.

== Biography ==
Ranzato began his career firstly as violin player on the Conservatory in Venice and Milan. Later he studied musical composition as well. Than he worked mostly as chamber music player or conductor. From around 1910 he worked mostly as a composer, and besides others he wrote an opera Campane di guerra (1933, Milan), and several operettas. Ranzato served as concertmaster for the LaScala Orchestra under Arturo Toscanini. He made several recordings on the Pathe label.

== Works ==
- it:Il paese dei campanelli (Milan, 1923) libretto Carlo Lombardo
- it:Cin Ci La (Milan, 1925) libretto Carlo Lombardo
