= Teatro Quirino =

Opera house in Rome

Coordinates: 41.8999°N 12.4825°E

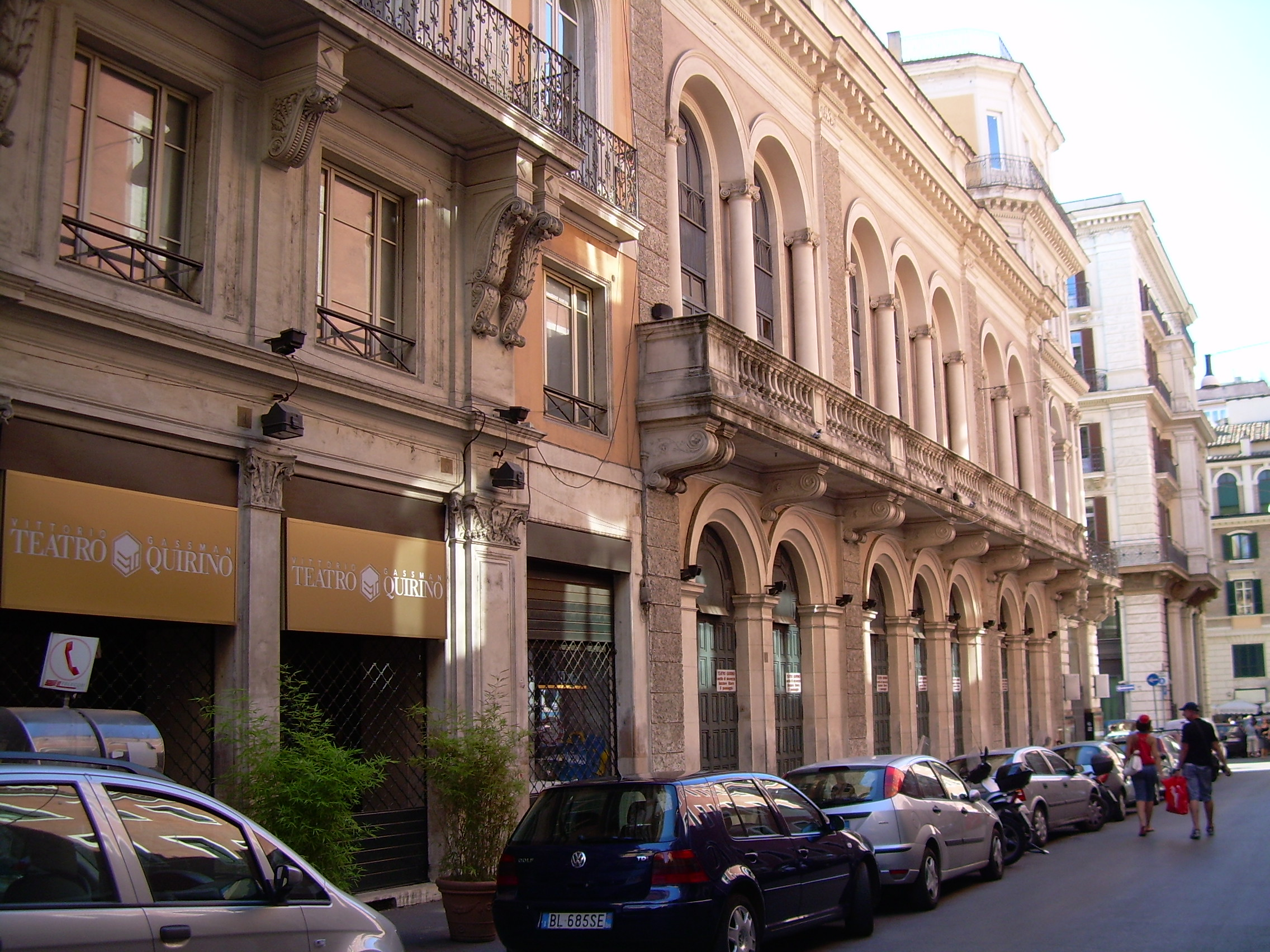
Teatro Quirino

The Teatro Quirino is an opera house in Rome opened in 1871. It hosted the premiere of Pietro Mascagni's operetta Sì.

Its historical name has been joined by the recognition for one of the most acclaimed Italian theatrical actors of the twentieth century, Vittorio Gassman. The full name of the theater is, in fact, Teatro Quirino - Vittorio Gassman. It is located in the Trevi district. From July 2014, management passed to a private company made up of sector operators whose CEO is Rosario Coppolino; Artistic consultants are Geppy Gleijeses and Guglielmo Ferro.

== History ==
The theater was built in 1871 at the behest of Prince Maffeo Barberini Colonna di Sciarra, who decided to entrust the project to the architect Giulio De Angelis, assisted by his colleague Francesco Marra (or Morra). The place chosen was inside the Sciarra Colonna palace, owned by the prince, with the main entrance from Via del Corso and extended up to the Trevi fountain. Taking advantage of the loss of the city by the Papal State, the organization of theatrical performances was no longer subject to any kind of limitation: Prince Maffeo thought of building a public theater building, in order to start a profitable business.

Conceived entirely of wood, it was erected in a single day. There were mainly represented operettas, however addressed to an audience of the middle bourgeois class. The name of the theater, Quirino, recalled the toponymy and mythology of Rome, linking itself to the name of the hill (the Quirinal) and to the god Quirinus.

Due to the need to create a communication artery between via del Corso and the Trevi fountain, in 1882 it was necessary to dismantle the wooden structure and to rebuild the theater in masonry a few meters away from the original location: the project, again entrusted to De Angelis, he donated a horseshoe-shaped hall and two tiers of boxes to the theater: the structure was metal, adorned with neoclassical cast iron columns. In 1898, upon completion of the works, the interiors of the theater were richly decorated with drapes, velvets and gilded stuccos, creating an elegant and cozy atmosphere. The production changed, bringing opera and ballet inside the Quirino.

In 1914, Marcello Piacentini changed the face of the theater, bringing the aesthetic line closer to the future architectural rationalism. A third tier of boxes was added (thanks to the lowering of the stalls) and a sunroof was built. Piacentini, however, also substantially modified the interiors but only with a second intervention, in 1954, where he left the external airspace of the building unchanged, but also obtained space for the offices of the Italian Theater Organization, which had taken direct management of it since 1946. The boxes were almost all eliminated to give way to cantilevered tiers, increasing the total capacity of the theater to 990 seats: the theater was adapted to the new regulations for safety in the field of theaters and equipped with new stage, ventilation and heating systems. In addition, a canopy was built that still exists today, typical of buildings for entertainment. The inauguration of the renovated theater took place on 13 October 1955. From July 2009 to June 2014 it was directed by Geppy Gleijeses.

== Events and representations ==
Among the most famous conductors of the 19th century who conducted at the Quirino Theater, there is M ° Antonino Palminteri, present on the podium in June 1899, staging works such as: I Lombardi by Giuseppe Verdi, Manon Lescaut, by Giacomo Puccini. The results of the performances were excellent and highly appreciated.
