= Le maschere =

Opera by Pietro Mascagni

- Opera by Pietro Mascagni
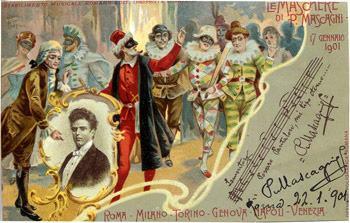
- Souvenir postcard for the premiere
- Translation: The Masks
- Librettist: Luigi Illica
- Language: Italian
- Premiere: 17 January 1901; La Scala, Milan, and five other opera houses in Italy

Le maschere (The Masks) is an opera in a prologue and three acts by Pietro Mascagni to an Italian libretto by Luigi Illica.

The work was Mascagni's homage to Rossini and to the Italian opera buffa and commedia dell'arte traditions. It was premiered simultaneously in six Italian opera houses on 17 January 1901: La Scala in Milan (with Caruso as Florindo, Carelli as Rosaura, and Toscanini conducting); the Teatro Carlo Felice in Genoa; the Teatro Regio in Turin; the Teatro Costanzi in Rome; La Fenice in Venice; and the Teatro Filarmonico in Verona. Two days later, it premiered at the Teatro di San Carlo in Naples.

Apart from the performance in Rome, conducted by Mascagni himself (and later in the first run by his pupil Roberto Moranzoni), Le maschere received a dismal reception, with the performance in Genoa suspended halfway through because of the audience's vociferous expressions of displeasure. The opera was sporadically performed in Italy over the next four years and then sank into obscurity. When Mascagni revised and represented the oper|thumba in 1931 it met with little lasting success. However, sporadic revivals in the late 20th century have been greeted with some critical interest.

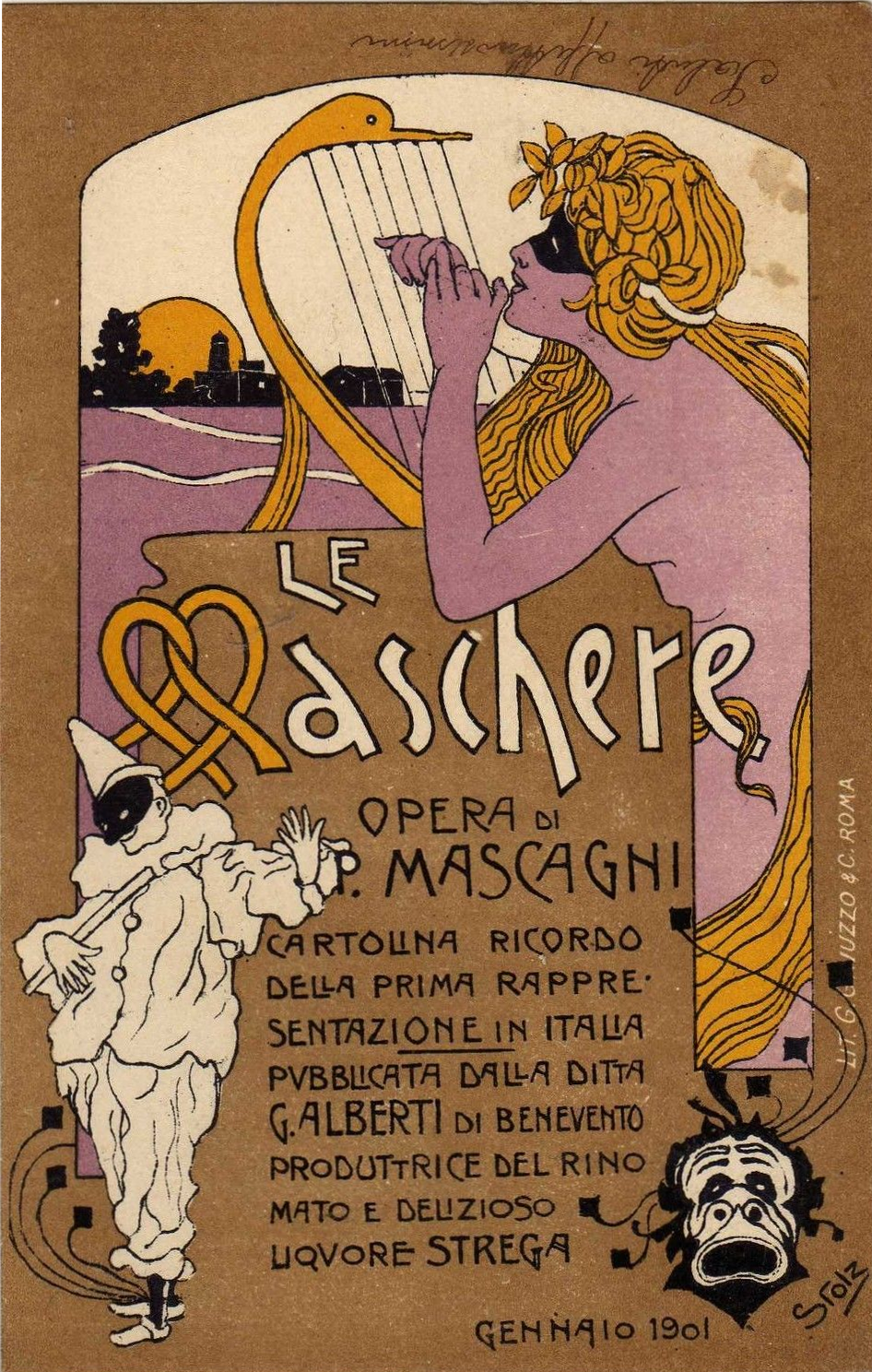

== Roles ==
Roles, voice types, premiere cast
Role	Voice type	Premiere cast at La Fenice 17 January 1901
Rosaura	soprano	Maria Farneti
Arlecchino Battocchio	tenor	E. Giordani
Colombina	soprano	M.a Fiori
Il Capitano Spaventa	baritone	Nestore della Torre
Brighella	tenor	Augusto Balboni
Dottore Graziano	baritone	Felice Foglia
Pantalone De' Bisognosi	bass	Ruggero Galli
Florindo	tenor	Elvino Ventura
Tartaglia	baritone	Giovanni Bellucci
Giocadio	spoken	Carlo Duse

== Synopsis ==
In the prologue, a travelling commedia dell'arte troupe and their impresario present the characters they are about to play. The remaining three acts are the play itself wherein after many vicissitudes, Florindo and Rosaura, aided by Columbina and Arlecchino, manage to prevent the marriage which Rosaura's father, Pantalone, had planned for her.

== Arias ==
The only frequently encountered aria is "Quella è una strada", a humorous aria sung – with much stuttering – by Tartaglia.

== Recordings ==
- Maria Josè Gallego, Vincenzo La Scola, Amelia Felle, Giuseppe Sabbatini, et al.; orchestra and chorus of the Teatro Comunale di Bologna; conductor: Gianluigi Gelmetti. Ricordi / Fonit Cetra RFCD 2004
- Antonio Cassinelli, Cesy Broggini, Ferrando Ferrari, Elena Rizzieri, Amedeo Berdini, Afro Poli; conductor Bruno Bartoletti. Trieste, 1961. Gala GL 100.731
