= Pietro Mascagni =

Italian composer (1863–1945)

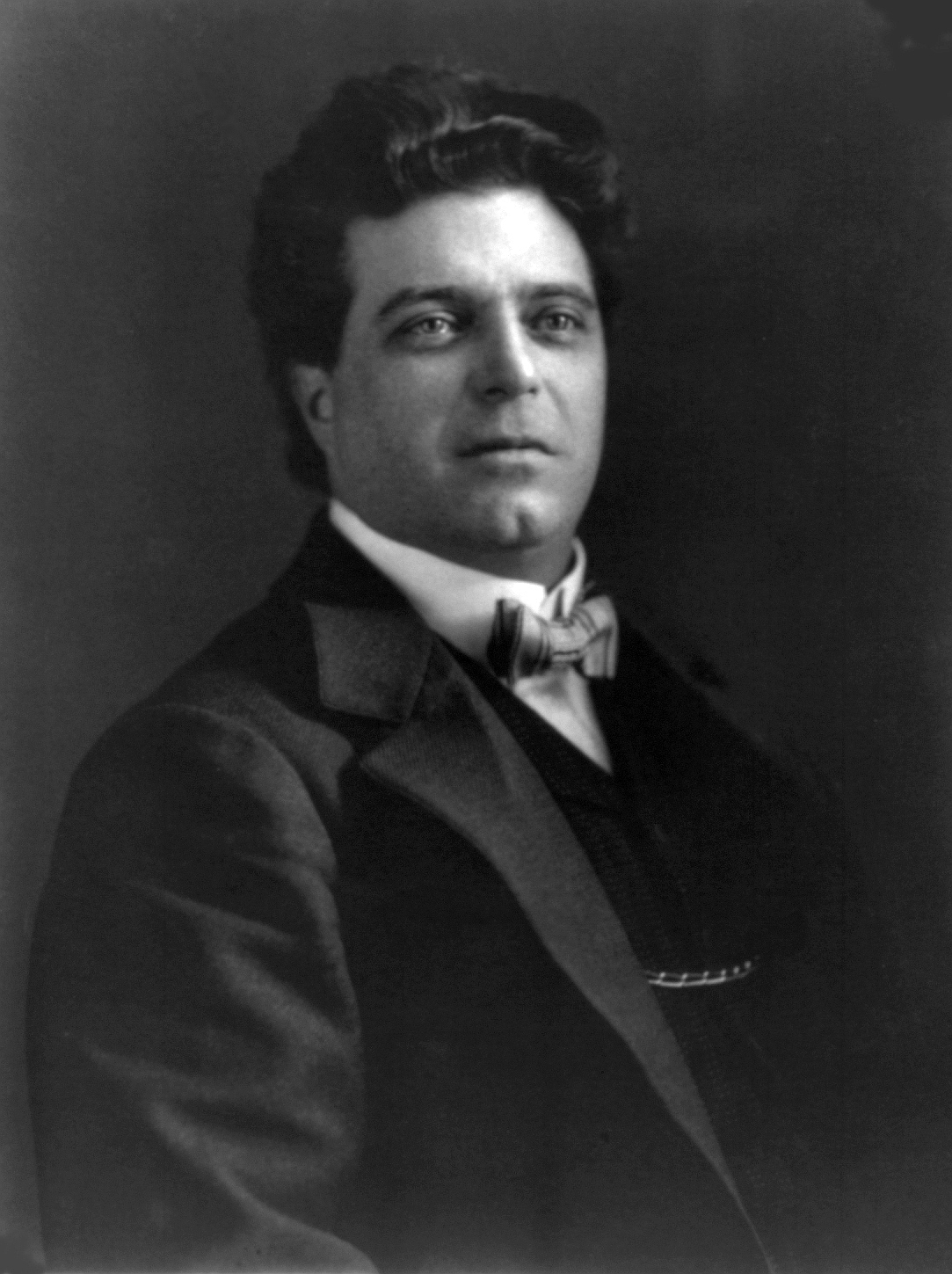
- Mascagni in 1902
- Born: Pietro Antonio Stefano Mascagni; 7 December 1863; Livorno, Kingdom of Italy
- Died: 2 August 1945 (aged 81); Rome, Kingdom of Italy
- Occupation: Composer
- Spouse: Lina Carbognani (m. 1889)
- Mascagni's voice Recorded 1940

Signature
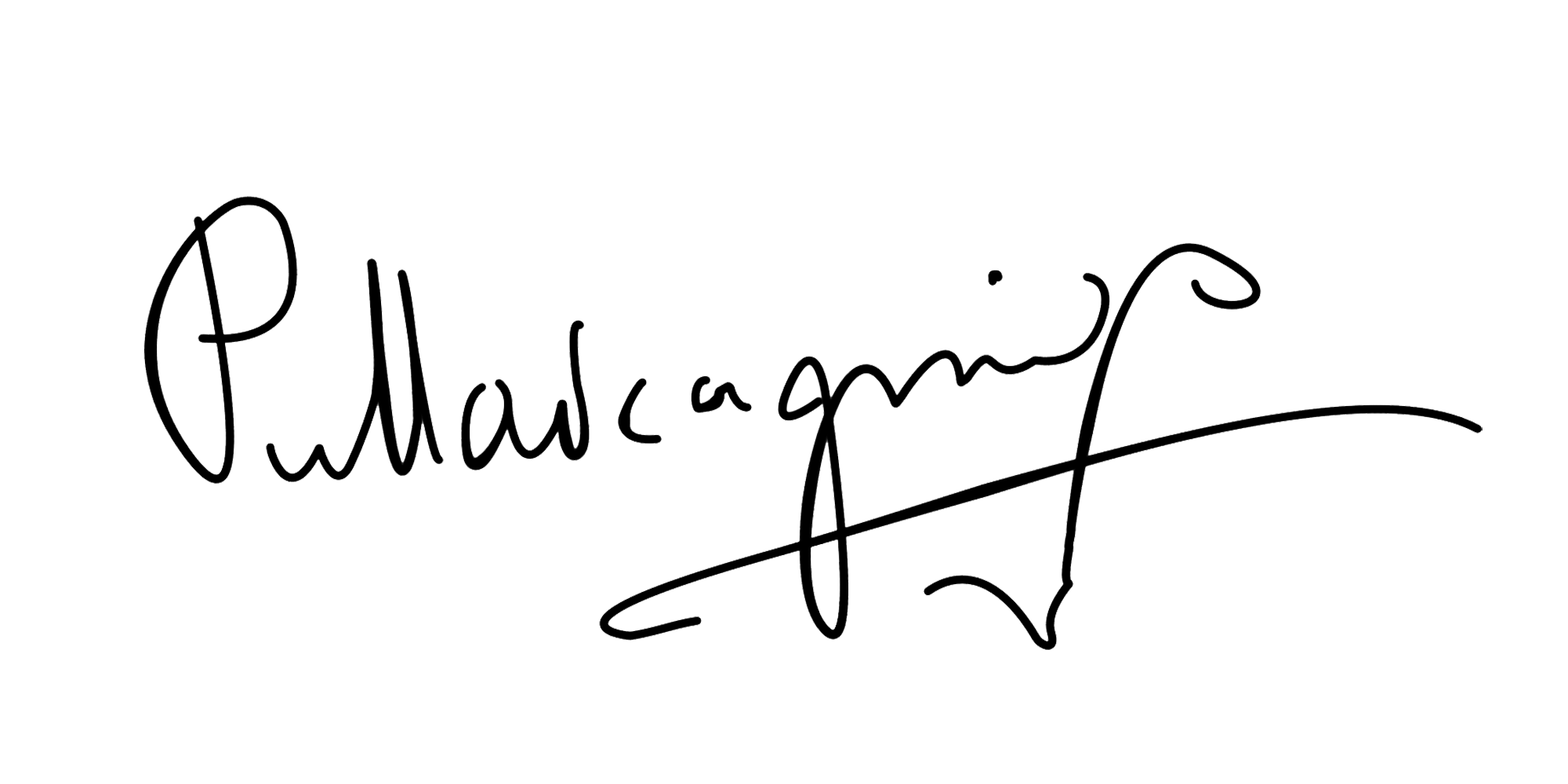

Pietro Mascagni (Note: Pronunciation: /mæˈskænji/ ma-SKAN-yee, US also /mɑːˈskɑːnji/ mah-SKAHN-yee; Italian: [ˈpjɛːtro maˈskaɲɲi].) (7 December 1863 – 2 August 1945) was an Italian composer primarily known for his operas. His 1890 masterpiece Cavalleria rusticana caused one of the greatest sensations in opera history and single-handedly ushered in the Verismo movement in Italian dramatic music. While it was often held that Mascagni, like Ruggero Leoncavallo, was a "one-opera man" who could never repeat his first success, L'amico Fritz and Iris have remained in the repertoire in Europe (especially Italy) since their premieres.

Mascagni wrote fifteen operas, an operetta, several orchestral and vocal works, and also songs and piano music. He enjoyed immense success during his lifetime, both as a composer and conductor of his own and other people's music and created a variety of styles in his operas.

== Biography ==
=== Early life and education ===
Mascagni was born on 7 December 1863 in Livorno, Tuscany, the second son of Domenico and Emilia Mascagni. His father owned and operated a bakery. Giovanni Targioni-Tozzetti ("Nanni") was born the same year in the same city and became Mascagni's lifelong friend and collaborator.

In 1876, at the age of 13, Mascagni began musical studies with Alfredo Soffredini, who founded the Instituto Musicale di Livorno (later called Istituto Cherubini). Soffredini had just completed his musical studies in Milan. Also a native of Livorno, Soffredini was a composer, teacher and musical critic. Mascagni started composing rapidly: between 1879 and 1880, he wrote several works: Sinfonia in do minore, Prima sinfonia in fa maggiore, Elegia, Kyrie, Gloria and Ave Maria.

=== Musical career: 1880–1889 ===
The premiere of Mascagni's first cantata, In Filanda, took place at the Istituto Cherubini on 9 February 1881. Performed at a musical contest in Milan, the cantata won the first prize. In the same year, Mascagni met the musicians Arrigo Boito and Amilcare Ponchielli in Milan.

In 1882, he composed his Cantata alla gioia from a text by Friedrich Schiller, followed by La stella di Garibaldi for voice and piano, and La tua stella. On 6 May Mascagni left Livorno for Milan. He passed the admission examination of the Milan Conservatory on 12 October. In Milan, Mascagni met the noted composer Giacomo Puccini, and was a student of Amintore Galli, artistic director of the Casa Musicale Sonzogno.

On 9 January 1883, Mascagni's sister, Maria, died. The cantata In Filanda became Pinotta, and was proposed for the musical contest of the Conservatorio, but as his registration was late, it was not accepted.

In 1884, he composed Ballata for tenor and piano; M'ama non m'ama, scherzo for soprano and piano; Messagio d'amore, and Alla luna.

In 1885, Mascagni composed Il Re a Napoli in Cremona, a romance for tenor and orchestra, on a text by Andrea Maffei. He left Milan without completing his studies. That year, he began touring as a conductor in the operetta companies of Vittorio Forlì, Alfonso and Ciro Scognamiglio, and, in Genoa, the company of Luigi Arnaldo Vassallo.

Mascagni met the impresario Luigi Maresca in 1886 and started working with him. That December, Mascagni arrived in Cerignola with Maresca's company. He was accompanied by Argenide Marcellina Carbognani (Lina), his future wife. Helped by the mayor Giuseppe Cannone, Mascagni soon left the company of Maresca, though not without problems.

He was appointed as the master of music and singing of the new philharmonia of Cerignola. His reputation grew. He also gave piano lessons. In February 1888, he began work on the Messa di Gloria. In July 1888, Casa Musicale Sonzogno announced in the Teatro Illustrato its second competition for a one-act opera, to be judged by a panel including Galli and Antonio Ghislanzoni. The following year, Mascagni completed his composition of Cavalleria rusticana on 27 May and sent the manuscript to Milan. Mascagni won against seventy-two other operas, including Niccola Spinelli's Labilia and Vincenzo Ferroni's Rudello.

Mascagni married Lina Carbognani on 3 February 1889. The next day their first son, Domenico Mascagni ("Mimì"), was born. Their son Dino was born on 3 January 1891. A daughter, Emi, was born in 1892.

=== 1890–1899 ===
Mascagni in c. 1890

On 21 February 1890, Mascagni was summoned to Rome to present his opera. The première of Cavalleria rusticana, winner of the Sonzogno contest, was held 17 May at the Teatro Costanzi in Rome. It had outstanding success, and the opera was soon performed in both the north and south of Italy: Florence, Turin, Bologna, Palermo, Milan, Genoa, Naples, Venice and Trieste.

In December, Gustav Mahler conducted the opera in Budapest. Soon thereafter, the cities of Munich, Hamburg, St. Petersburg, Dresden and Buenos Aires welcomed the opera. In March 1891, it was sung in Vienna. At age 26, Mascagni had become internationally famous.

Mascagni premiered his L'amico Fritz, his second most successful opera, on 31 October 1891 at the Teatro Costanzi in Rome. I Rantzau premiered on 10 November at the Teatro La Pergola, in Florence, under his personal direction.

The composer next completed Silvano (1894). On 16 February 1895, he premiered Guglielmo Ratcliff at the Teatro alla Scala of Milan. On 15 March Silvano was premiered at the same theatre. That year, Mascagni accepted the directorship of the Liceo Rossini in Pesaro and moved his family there.

On 2 March 1896, Mascagni conducted the première of Zanetto at the Liceo. He continued his composing and directing. On 29 June 1898 in Recanati, Mascagni conducted the première of his symphonic poem, A Giacomo Leopardi. Mascagni began a collaboration with Luigi Illica, a librettist. Their first work, Iris, was premiered on 22 November at the Teatro Costanzi in Rome.

Mascagni's father died in May 1899.

=== 1900–1909 ===
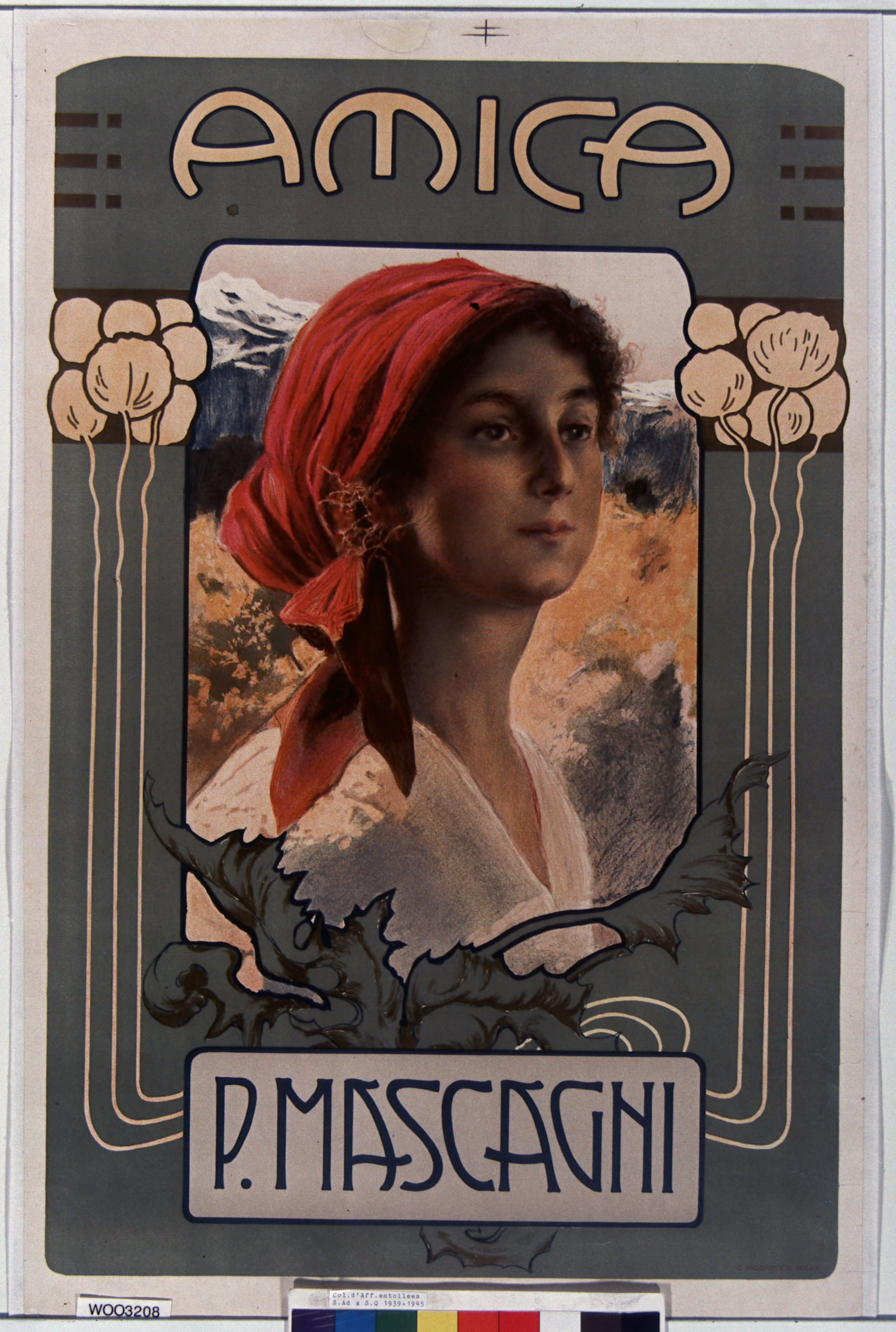
Amica poster, 1905, showing Geraldine Farrar who performed the title role in the Monte Carlo premiere.

In 1900, Mascagni toured Moscow and St. Petersburg and, on 17 January 1901, Le maschere was premiered in six Italian theatres. Giuseppe Verdi died on 27 January and the following month Mascagni commemorated Verdi's passing. That same year, he conducted Verdi's Requiem in Vienna.

Mascagni composed the incidental music for Hall Caine's play, The Eternal City in August 1902; the première of the play with Mascagni's music took place in London on 2 October.

In 1902 and 1903, he toured in Canada and the United States, (in particular Montreal, New York City, Philadelphia, Boston and San Francisco), where he conducted many of his and other composers' works. The tour was mostly a fiasco, except for the visit to San Francisco where Mascagni was extremely well received.

In 1903, Mascagni left Pesaro after problems with the authorities. He became director of the Scuola Musicale Romana, in Rome. In the same year, he signed a contract with the French editor Paul de Choudens.

Amica, based on a poem by Choudens with a French libretto by Paul Collin, was premiered on 16 March 1905, in Monte-Carlo. That year, he had disputes with Ruggero Leoncavallo and Giacomo Puccini. He also had the Livornese première of Le maschere.

Mascagni was director of the Costanzi for the season beginning in August 1909.

=== 1910–1919 ===
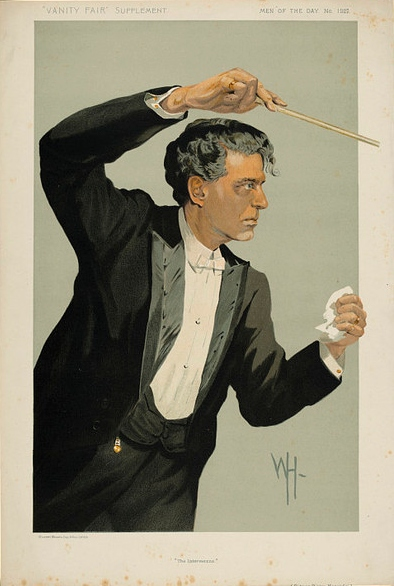
Mascagni caricatured in Vanity Fair, 1912

On 4 April 1910, Mascagni began a relationship with Anna Lolli. In October he was reconciled with Puccini.

Mascagni ceased his activity as director of the Scuola Musicale Romana in 1911. That May he left for Buenos Aires, beginning a seven-month tour in South America. The première of Isabeau took place in Buenos Aires on 2 June.

The Italian première of Isabeau was held simultaneously at La Scala in Milan (conductor Tullio Serafin) and at La Fenice in Venice (conductor Mascagni) in 1912. On 28 March, he began to work on Parisina in Bellevue, near Paris, sometimes with his daughter Emi, his mistress Anna Lolli, and the librettist Gabriele d'Annunzio.

Parisina was premiered in Milan on 15 December of that year. Almost all the important Italian composers of the time were present, among them Puccini, Umberto Giordano and Riccardo Zandonai. The new work was premiered in Livorno and Rome in 1914. On 28 July, the events occurred that shortly led to World War I: Puccini and Mascagni were against the involvement of Italy in this war, in which Mascagni's son Dino was later made a prisoner.

In 1915 Mascagni wrote music for Nino Oxilia's movie Rapsodia Satanica; the custom was for silent films to be accompanied live in a theatre by organ, piano, or an orchestra, often using a prepared score (sometimes with original music) with cues for the conductor or musician. Mascagni had a quarrel regarding the rights of Louise de la Ramée's Two Little Wooden Shoes (I due Zoccoletti), which inspired both Puccini and Mascagni. The subject was retained by Mascagni for Lodoletta. The latter opera was premiered on 30 April 1917 in Rome. The Livornese première of the opera was on 28 July with Beniamino Gigli as Flammen.

Sì, Mascagni's operetta, which he had been manoeuvred into writing by the impresario Carlo Lombardo, was premiered on 13 December in Rome.

=== 1920–1939 ===
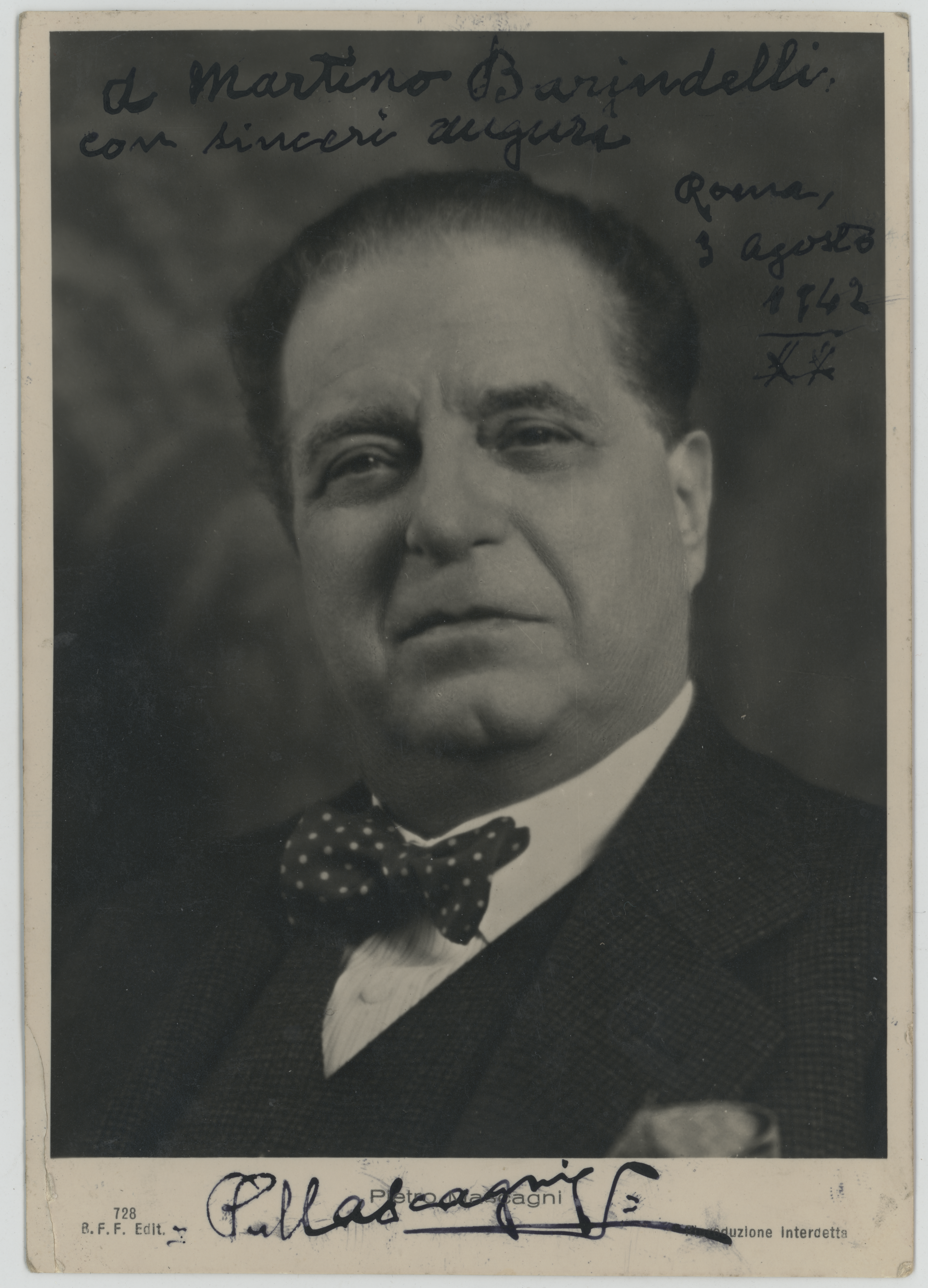
Pietro Mascagni (photo with 1942 dedication)

In 1920 Mascagni composed Il piccolo Marat, which was premiered in Rome on 2 May 1921, followed by a premiere in Buenos Aires in September. The composer returned to South America for a tour beginning in May 1922.

In 1923, he composed Visione Lirica. Mascagni appeared on the cover of Time on 6 September 1926.

He moved to the Grand Hotel Plaza in Rome in 1927, a place he would not leave until his death.

In 1930, Mascagni conducted La bohème in Torre del Lago, as a homage to Puccini, who had died in 1924. In 1931, Le maschere was performed at La Scala.

Pinotta was premiered in San Remo on 23 March 1932. He joined the PNF (Fascist party), following the example of many contemporary musicians, including Giordano.

Nerone was premièred in Milan on 16 January 1935, followed by the première in Livorno on 24 August.

In June 1936, Mascagni's son Dino died in Somalia.

=== Last years ===
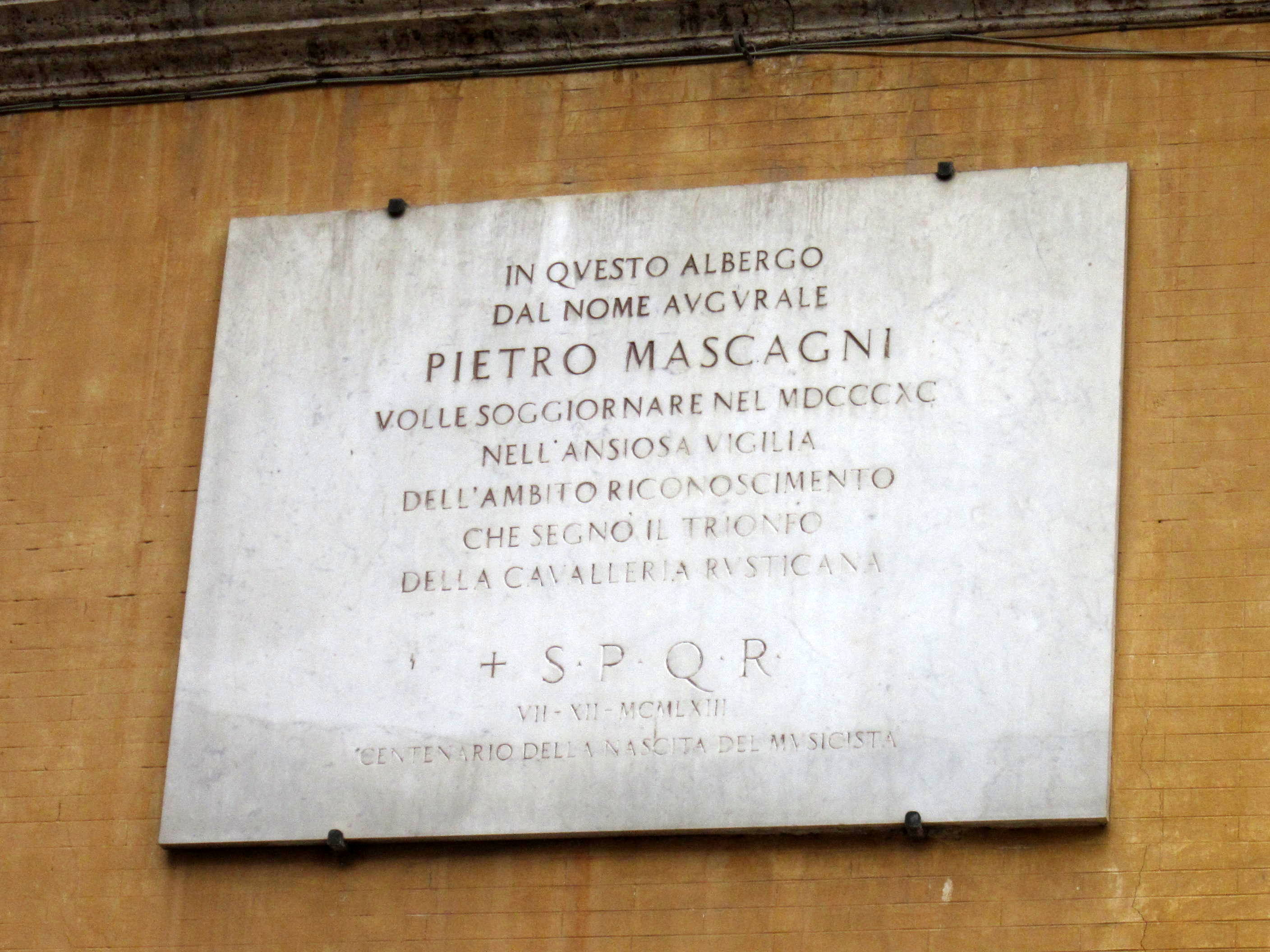
Plaque dedicated to Mascagni in the Albergo del Sole, Piazza della Rotonda, Rome

In 1940, celebrations for the fiftieth anniversary of his most popular opera, Cavalleria rusticana, took place all over Italy, often with Mascagni conducting. The opera was recorded for La Voce del padrone ("His Master's Voice") at La Scala under the direction of Mascagni, who recorded a special spoken introduction. EMI later reissued the recording on LP and CD.

In 1942, after an audience with Pope Pius XII, newspapers quoted Mascagni, a Roman Catholic, as saying that his tuberculosis-stricken niece was cured after receiving a rosary and silver medal blessed by the pope.

In April 1943, Mascagni appeared for the last time at La Scala to conduct L'amico Fritz. By that time he had to conduct sitting on a chair. The last season of Mascagni at the Rome Opera (Cavalleria rusticana and L'amico Fritz) was 1944–45.

Mascagni died on 2 August 1945 in his apartment at the Grand Hotel Plaza in Rome. The funeral ceremony was on 4 August. The Italian authorities were not present. In 1951, his body was transferred from Rome to Livorno, where Mascagni finally received an official homage. On 7 December 1963, the centenary of Mascagni's birth, a plaque was erected in Rome on the Albergo del Sole where Mascagni stayed during the premiere of Cavalleria rusticana.

== Selected works ==
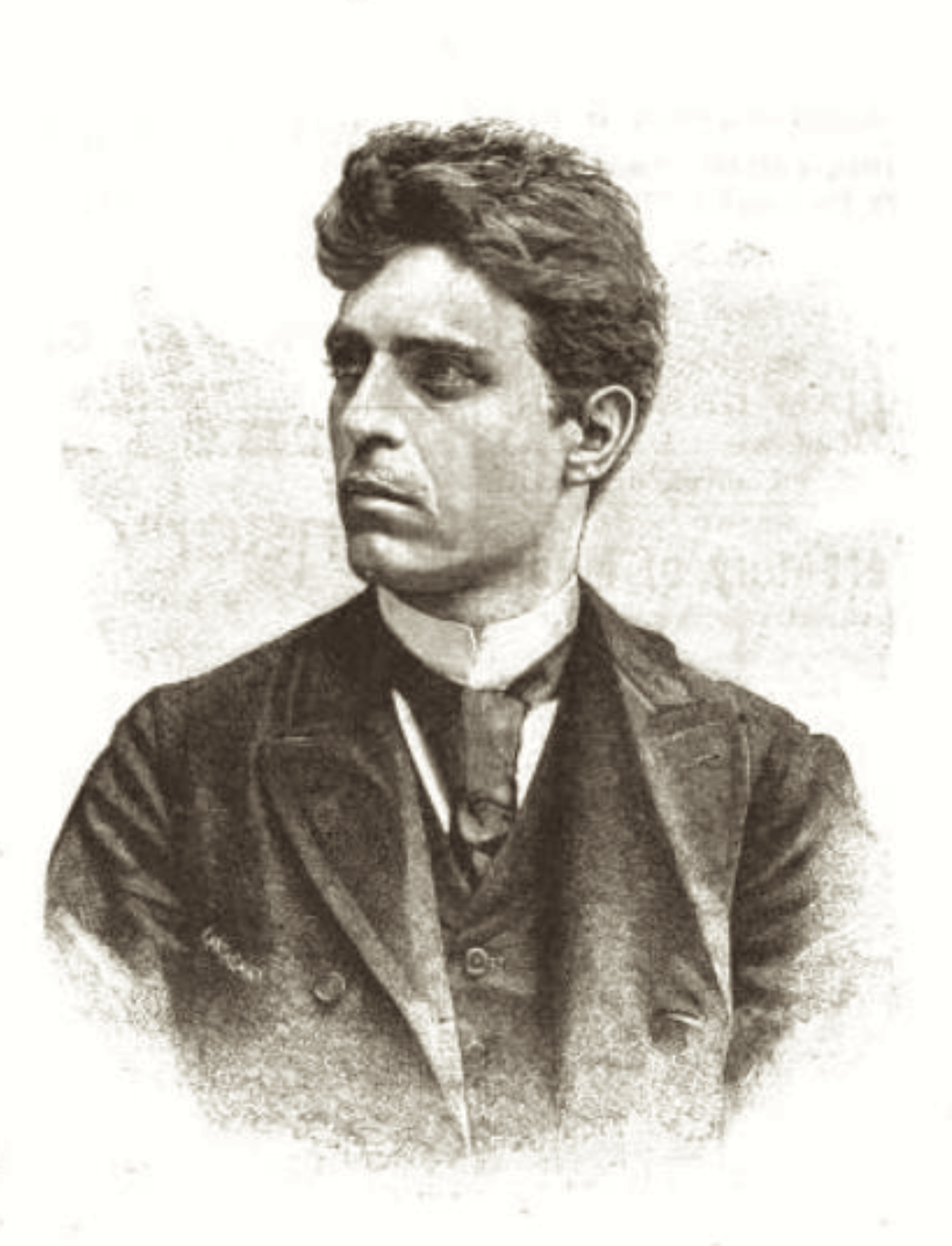
Pietro Mascagni in 1891

=== Operas ===
Cavalleria Rusticana: Intermezzo Sinfonico

- Cavalleria rusticana (17 May 1890 Teatro Costanzi, Rome)
- L'amico Fritz (31 October 1891 Teatro Costanzi, Rome)
- I Rantzau (10 November 1892 Teatro La Pergola, Florence)
- Guglielmo Ratcliff (16 February 1895 Teatro alla Scala, Milan), composed between 1885 and the early 1890s
- Silvano (25 March 1895 Teatro alla Scala, Milan)
- Zanetto (2 March 1896 Liceo Musicale, Pesaro)
- Iris (22 November 1898 Teatro Costanzi, Rome)
- Le maschere (17 January 1901 Teatro Carlo Felice, Genoa – Teatro Regio, Turin – Teatro alla Scala, Milan – Teatro La Fenice, Venice – Teatro Filarmonico, Verona – Teatro Costanzi, Rome)
- Amica (16 March 1905, Monte Carlo, in French)
- Isabeau (2 June 1911 Teatro Coliseo, Buenos Aires)
- Parisina (15 December 1913 Teatro alla Scala, Milan)
- Lodoletta (30 April 1917 Teatro Costanzi, Rome)
- Il piccolo Marat (2 May 1921 Teatro Costanzi, Rome)
- Pinotta (23 March 1932 Casinò, San Remo), adapted from the cantata In filanda (1881)
- Nerone (16 January 1935 Teatro alla Scala, Milan), with music written between the 1890s and the 1930s

=== Operetta ===
- Sì (13 December 1919 Teatro Quirino, Rome)

=== Sacred music ===
- Messa di Gloria in F major for soloists, chorus and orchestra (1888)

=== Orchestral music ===
- A Giacomo Leopardi, cantata for voice (soprano) and orchestra (19 June 1898, Teatro Persiani, Recanati)
- Il re a Napoli, romanza for tenor and orchestra (18 March 1885 Teatro Municipale, Cremona)

=== Projects contemplated ===
During his long career, Mascagni contemplated writing many operas. The following is an incomplete list of such projects, which never saw the light of day:

- Zilia, probably on a libretto by Felice Romani (c. 1877)
- Scampolo, probably on a libretto by Dario Niccodemi (c. 1921)
- I Bianchi ed i Neri, on a libretto by Mario Ghisalberti (c. 1938)

== In other media ==
The soundtrack of the 1980 film Raging Bull uses the Intermezzo from Cavalleria rusticana, the Barcarolle from Silvano, and the Intermezzo from Guglielmo Ratcliff (known as Il sogno di Ratcliff).

The 1990 film The Godfather Part III used a production of Cavalleria rusticana at the Teatro Massimo in Palermo as the setting for its climax, with Michael Corleone's son Anthony as Turiddu. The movie ends with the Intermezzo playing.

== Notes and references ==
Notes
