= Mario Pasquale Costa =

Italian composer

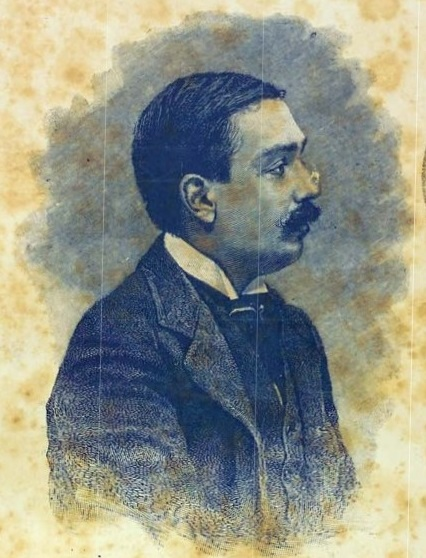
- Born: Pasquale Antonio Cataldo Maria Costa; 24 July 1858; Taranto, Kingdom of the Two Sicilies
- Died: 27 September 1933 (aged 75); Monte Carlo, Monaco
- Occupation: composer

Mario Pasquale Costa (24 July 1858 –27 September 1933) was a prolific Italian composer primarily known for his art songs, Neapolitan songs, and operettas.

Costa was born in Taranto to Angelo and Maria Giuseppa née Malagisi. His father was a customs official, but the Costa family numbered several notable composers and musicians, including Costa's uncle Michael Costa and his great-grandfather Giacomo Tritto. Costa studied composition, piano and singing at the San Pietro a Maiella Conservatory in Naples under another uncle Carlo Costa, Paolo Serrao, and Giuseppe Martucci.

By the age of 17, Costa had already published numerous art songs. Possessed of an attractive tenor voice, he often performed them himself for the first time. Between 1881 and 1884 he lived and worked in London where Italian songs were very much in vogue. On his return to Naples, he became very active in the revival of the Neapolitan musical tradition. After 1920 he concentrated on composing operettas, pantomimes, and ballets. Costa died in Monte Carlo in 1933. The following year his remains were brought to Taranto and placed in a monumental tomb erected by the city.
