= Teatro Coccia =

- The theatre seen from Puccini Square
- Interactive map of Teatro Coccia
- Address: Via F.lli Rosselli 47 – 28100; Novara; Italy
- Coordinates: 45°26′43.91″N 8°37′05.52″E
- Capacity: 918 (1,800 up to last restoration)

Construction
- Opened: 22 December 1888, with the opera Les Huguenots by G. Meyerbeer, directed by Arturo Toscanini.
- Architect: Giuseppe Oliverio

Website
- www.fondazioneteatrococcia.it

Teatro Coccia (pronounced [teˈaːtro ˈkɔttʃa], "Coccia Theatre") is the main opera house in Novara (as well as one of the major traditional Italian theatres), and is also the most important "historical" theatre in Piedmont. It faces along via Fratelli Rosselli, and delimits piazza dei Martiri to the west and piazza Giacomo Puccini to the east.

== History ==
Back in the day, Novara did not have a permanent theatre, and operas took place in private venues, such as noblemen's rooms and courts. The preferred venue was Casa Petazzi, equipped with a gallery and boxes. Count Luigi Maria Torinelli, together with the newly formed Società dei Palchettisti (English: Society of Box Holders), provided the funds for a new theatre. The new theater was called Teatro Civico, also known as Teatro Nuovo. Construction works started in 1777. The opera house was completed in two years, being inaugurated in 1779 (with Medonte re d'Epiro by Giuseppe Sarti) on a project of Cosimo Morelli. The Galliari brothers completed the decorations on the interior, as well as the stage curtain. On the latter, they depicted Hercules, the mythological founder of the city. The boxes were covered in blue silk, and they held carved seats in rich brocade. Luigi Canonica restructured the Civico/Nuovo in 1830. Between 1853 and 1855 the Teatro Sociale, a second theatre, opened in Novara. A fierce competition between the Teatro Sociale, hosting minor companies and promoting young talents, and the Teatro Civico/Nuovo, later renamed Teatro Antico, ensued. When Carlo Coccia died in 1873, the Antico's name was changed again, in Teatro Coccia.

The municipal council of Novara acquired both theatres in 1880, willing to replace them with a new opera house, since the Teatro Nuovo's capacity was considered inadequate to the demands of the day, as a result, in 1886 the Teatro Nuovo was demolished. At that time, in fact, the city saw a notable demographic growth and an affirmation of the bourgeoisie, increasingly turning to the world of culture, where the interest in theatrical performances was not limited only to the noble and prestigious families of Novara but involved the rest of the citizenship. Already around 1860 the Novara architect Alessandro Antonelli had proposed the merger of the Teatro Nuovo with the Teatro Sociale, to unify the various types of shows in a single building, but the majestic project was judged too expensive and disproportionate to the demands and financial resources of the city.

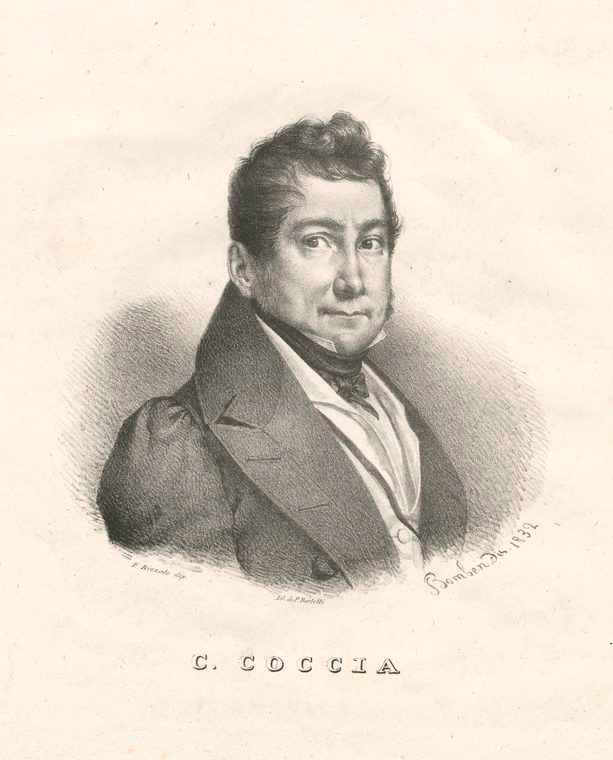
Carlo Coccia

On 13 April 1873, in Novara, Carlo Coccia, who had been for more than thirty years master of the Cappella del Capitolo del Duomo (which boasts an important tradition of opera masters, such as Pietro Generali, Saverio Mercadante and Antonio Cagnoni), as well as director of the Civic Institute of Music "Brera", died. As mentioned, the Teatro Nuovo, which for some time had required its own name, to worthily honour the distinguished musician, took the latter's name on 6 July of the same year. The contract of 9 March 1886, was entrusted to the Milanese architect Giuseppe Oliverio to the detriment of the too expensive project developed by Andrea Scala.

== Architecture ==
In 1886 work began on the new Coccia; a lot of material from the previous theatre was used, which was almost completely demolished.

The new complex occupied an area four times larger and was oriented differently than the old theatre, with the entrance on the current via Fratelli Rosselli instead of today's largo Puccini. The external perimeter was surrounded by a porch in pink Baveno granite, with Doric style columns, and by a single floor with huge windows (alternating, also, with Ionic style columns).

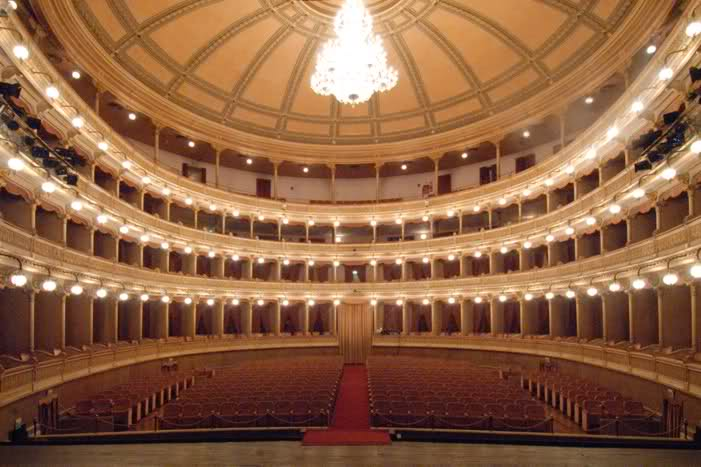
View from the stage

Even today the grandeur of the horseshoe-shaped room is striking, surrounded by three orders of large boxes, the first gallery and the loggione, all decorated in the Renaissance style, with a series of Corinthian cast-iron columns surmounted by a sculpture depicting a swan. The capacity of the hall was 1500 seats, with a maximum of 1800 people; the latest restoration works, however, have reduced the capacity, bringing the number of seats to 918. The proscenium is 14 metres long, the depth is 23 metres, while the scenic tower of the grating is 22.5 metres high. There is also another hall for shows, called "Piccolo Coccia", with a capacity of 200 seats. The last restoration, completed in 1993, has brought back the original colours of the room (velvets in antique pink, ivory and gold decorations), after the changes that took place in the 20s/30s of the last century, which had replaced the upholstery with the red colour, and made total gilding of the parapets of the boxes.

== Great debuts and artistic activity ==
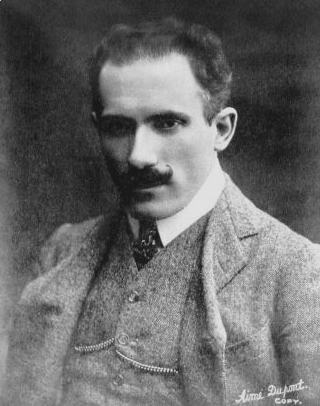
Arturo Toscanini inaugurated the Teatro Coccia with Les Huguenots, followed by the Aida and La forza del destino

The inauguration of the new Coccia Theater took place on the evening of 22 December 1888, with the opera Les Huguenots by Giacomo Meyerbeer, directed by the great virtuoso conductor Arturo Toscanini. Probably due to the complexity of the music, the inaugural opera was not well received. The Maestro Toscanini would direct in the Novara temple also Aida and La forza del destino by Giuseppe Verdi, as part of the inaugural season of the theater, conducted by Toscanini. On 21 December 1893, the second version of Giacomo Puccini's Manon Lescaut was performed for the first time at the Coccia. At the turn of 1895 and 1896, Maestro Antonino Palminteri directed respectively Tannhäuser by Richard Wagner and Loreley by Alfredo Catalani. In December 1900 Antonino Palminteri returned to Coccia to conduct Tosca and the success was so resounding that La Stampa expressed itself as follows: "The Tosca at the Coccia. As for the [...] splendid performance, the orchestra conducted by Palminteri, which he played with such confidence that it certainly did not reveal it was a first performance. And credit for this goes to maestro Palminteri who was able to give impetus, color and effectiveness [...] and therefore Puccini's music was well enjoyed." Giacomo Puccini sent to Maestro Antonino Palminteri a telegram reading : "Giacomo Puccini gratefully rejoices with the Egr. M° Palminteri and with the performers for the success obtained in Novara [...] Greetings and best wishes, G.Puccini."

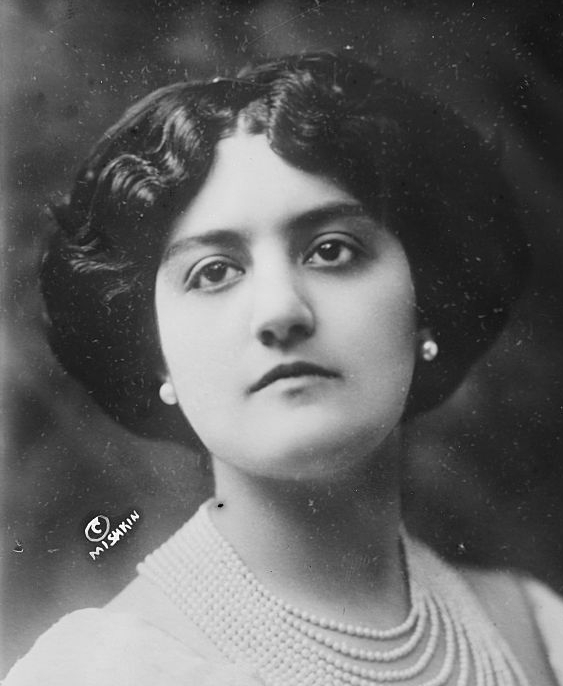
Carmen Melis debuted with Iris and was the protagonist of Poliuto and Tosca at the Teatro Coccia of Novara

An article in the Corriere della Sera of 1932 defined the Coccia theater as the antechamber for the Teatro alla Scala. This flattery is due to the fact that many of the great artists of the world opera scene made their debut on the Novara stage, such as the soprano Carmen Melis in Iris by Pietro Mascagni (1905/06 season), the soprano Gilda Dalla Rizza in La forza del destino by Giuseppe Verdi (1912/13 season), the tenor Antonio Melandri in Lucia di Lammermoor by Gaetano Donizetti (season 1922/23), soprano Sara Scuderi in Il Trovatore by Giuseppe Verdi (season 1924/25), the Novara tenor Angelo Badà (one of the most famous supporting actors of the early 1900s). In recent years, the prestigious sticks of Gino Marinuzzi, Antonino Palminteri, Lorenzo Molajoli, Pietro Fabbroni, Napoleone Annovazzi, Pietro Mascagni, Giuseppe Podestà, Alberto Franchetti, Federico Del Cupolo and Arturo Lucon (who will be the artistic director of the Coccia from 1945 until his death in 1950) dominated the podium of the Novara theater. It should also be noted of the many presences of artists such as Mafalda Favero, Gina Cigna, Lina Pagliughi, Toti Dal Monte, Rosetta Pampanini, Lina Bruna Rasa, Clara Petrella, Bianca Scacciati, Mercedes Capsir, Giuseppina Cobelli, Tito Schipa, Augusto Ferrauto, Aureliano Pertile, Carlo Galeffi, Luciano Neroni, Giulio Neri, Galliano Masini, Mario Filippeschi, Giuseppe Valdengo, Antonio Salvarezza, Mariano Stabile, Giovanni Inghilleri and Enzo Mascherini.

The 1940s saw another great debut (despite the world conflict, the theatre would continue its activity): on the podium of the "Coccia" stepped for the first time Novara's own Guido Cantelli with La traviata by Giuseppe Verdi (with Gina Cigna). Cantelli in 1943, after the huge success, directed Madama Butterfly by Puccini, a second Traviata with Margherita Carosio, Afro Poli and Giacinto Prandelli, the Werther by Jules Massenet (with Giovanni Malipiero), and in 1945 Tosca. In the following years, up to the end of the 70s, in the Novara seasons the big names were always protagonists, indeed Renata Tebaldi, Mario Del Monaco, Giuseppe Di Stefano, Boris Christoff, Virginia Zeani, Anna De Cavalieri, Ebe Stignani, Giulietta Simionato, Nicola Filacuridi, Aldo Protti, Anna Moffo, Rita Orlandi Malaspina, Margherita Guglielmi, Giulio Fioravanti, Gianna Galli, Bonaldo Giaiotti and Giovanna Casolla came to perform at the Novara theater. The most assiduous conductors of these years are Franco Patanè, Ermanno Wolf-Ferrari, Napoleone Annovazzi, Alberto Zedda and Armando Gatto. In the 1964/65 season, Luchino Visconti directed La traviata.

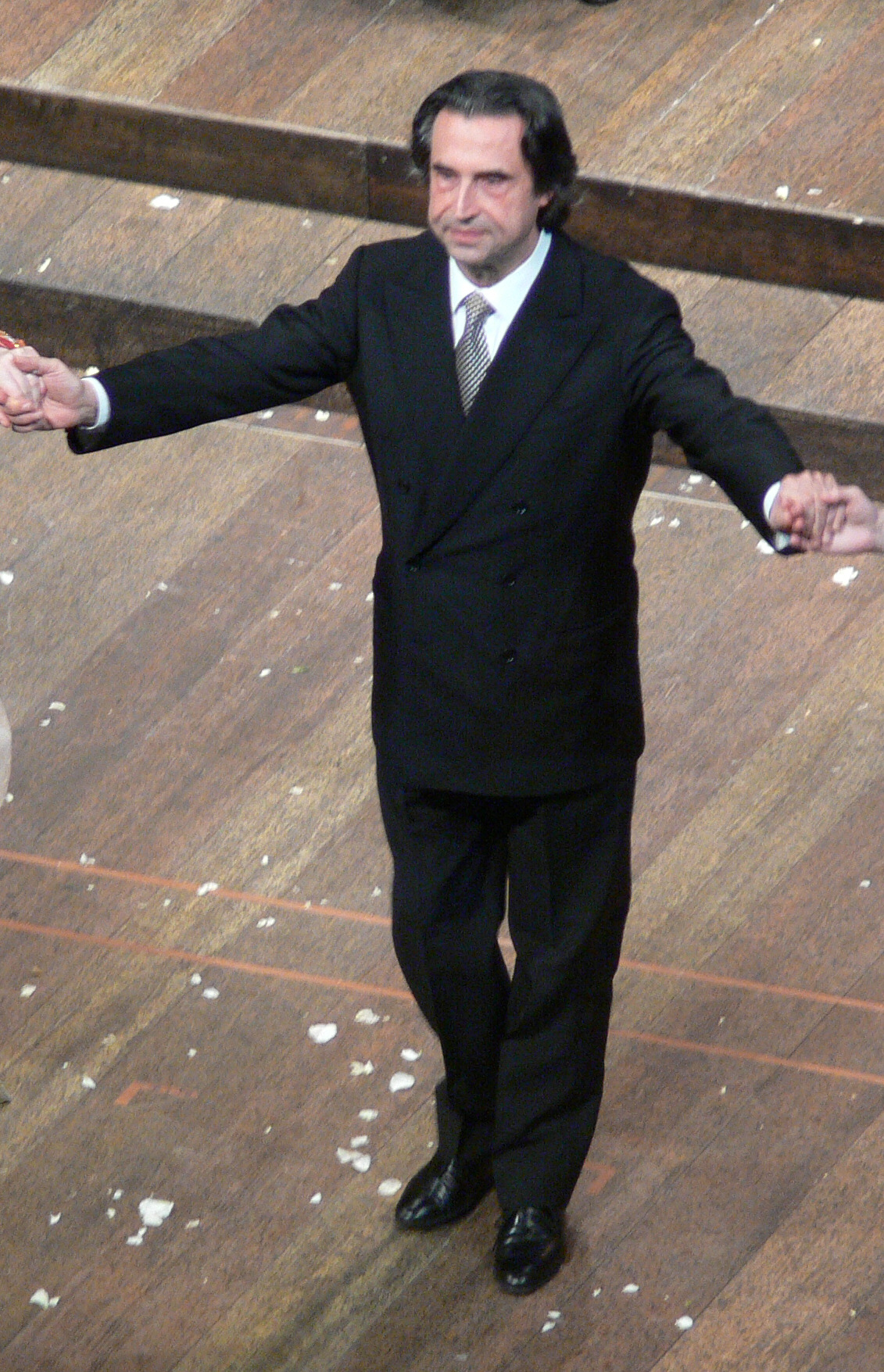
Riccardo Muti, winner of the 4th edition of the Cantelli Award, was the chosen director on the day of the theatre's reopening, on January 21, 1993

Another great debut at the Coccia theatre was that of Riccardo Muti, winner of the "Cantelli Award" in 1967, a competition for young conductors.

In 1983 the sopranos Daniela Dessì, in L'elisir d'amore by Gaetano Donizetti, and Denia Mazzola Gavazzeni, in A Masked Ball by Giuseppe Verdi, made their debut at the Coccia. In 1986 it was then the turn of the tenor Luca Canonici in Rigoletto by Verdi; this was the last year before the big restoration. The theatre, which is still owned by the "palchettisti's" society, was sold to the municipality in 1986 (on a proposal strongly supported by Umberto Orsini from Novara), which assumed all the rights for the adaptation and renovation. The reopening took place in 1993 with a concert by the La Scala Philharmonic Orchestra conducted by Riccardo Muti, and the opera season reopened with the opera Les Huguenots by Meyerbeer, with Katia Ricciarelli, Nikola Gjuzelev and the debutante Paoletta Marrocu. In the following years, the Novarese stage was walked by such singers as Luciana Serra, Cecilia Gasdia, Tiziana Fabbricini, Daniela Lojarro, Enzo Dara, Alberto Gazale, Franco Vassallo (who made his debut at the Coccia with L'amico Fritz in 1994), Marco Berti, Giorgio Surian, Patrizia Ciofi, Giorgio Zancanaro, Stefania Bonfadelli, Dīmītra Theodosiou, Roberto Aronica, Veronica Simeoni, Bruno Praticò and Jessica Pratt; conductors and directors such as Nello Santi, Matteo Beltrami, Andrean Battistoni, Bruno Aprea, Franco Zeffirelli, Beppe de Tomasi, Pierluigi Pizzi, Giorgio Gallione, Alberto Fassini, Renato Bonajuto, Dario Argento, Daniele Abbado.

== Most performed operas at the Coccia Theatre since 1888 ==
Author	Title	First performance	Last performance	Presenze nelle stagioni
Verdi	La traviata	1892	2019	27
Puccini	La bohème	1896	2016	22
Puccini	Tosca	1900	2014	22
Puccini	Madama Butterfly	1906	2017	22
Verdi	Rigoletto	1890	2011	20
Rossini	The Barber of Seville	1894	2015	18
Mascagni	Cavalleria rusticana	1891	2010	16
Bizet	Carmen	1889	2012	14
Leoncavallo	Pagliacci	1895	2010	14
Verdi	Il trovatore	1894	2005	12
Donizetti	Lucia di Lammermoor	1896	2012	12
Donizetti	Don Pasquale	1897	2011	12
Verdi	Aida	1888	2016	12
Puccini	Manon Lescaut	1893	1999	10
Verdi	Otello	1890	2007	9
Verdi	Un ballo in maschera	1894	1983	9
Giordano	Andrea Chénier	1908	1980	8
Puccini	Turandot	1926	2015	8
Ponchielli	La Gioconda	1889	1951	7
Donizetti	L'elisir d'amore	1897	2006	7
Verdi	La forza del destino	1888	1953	6
Cimarosa	Il matrimonio segreto	1911	2012	6
Bellini	La sonnambula	1894	2006	5
Massenet	Manon	1899	1956	5
Mascagni	L'amico Fritz	1905	1994	5
Donizetti	La Favorita	1889	1913	4
Giordano	Fedora	1903	1940	4
Catalani	La Wally	1907	1938	4
Meyerbeer	Gli Ugonotti	1888	1993	3
Verdi	Ernani	1890	2019	4
Boito	Mefistofele	1891	1937	3
Wagner	Lohengrin	1892	1960	3
Catalani	Loreley	1895	1925	3
Gounod	Faust	1896	2005	3
Donizetti	La figlia del reggimento	1897	2007	3
Cilea	Adriana Lecouvreur	1903	2008	3
Mascagni	Isabeau	1911	1933	3
Puccini	La fanciulla del West	1912	1940	3
Verdi	Macbeth	1999	2014	2
Catalani	Edmea	1893	1915	2
Thomas	Mignon	1893	1923	2
Cagnoni	Papà Martin	1898	1933	2
Perosi	La resurrezione di Lazzaro	1902	1923	2
Mascagni	Iris	1905	1923	2
Verdi	Falstaff	1906	1993	2
Massenet	Thais	1913	1928	2
Massenet	Werther	1920	1944	2
Rossini	Cenerentola	1920	1997	2
Zandonai	Francesca da Rimini	1925	1941	2
Mascagni	Il piccolo Marat	1925	1937	2
Wolf-Ferrari	Il segreto di Susanna	1927	1942	2
Mussorgsky	Boris Godunov	1927	1932	2
Halévy	La Juive	1894	1894	1
Sciortino	La Paura	2015	2015	1
Coletta	Il canto dell'amore trionfante	2014	2014	1
Wagner	Tannhäuser	1895	1895	1
Floridia	Maruzza	1896	1896	1
Ricci	Crispino e la comare	1897	1897	1
Auber	Fra Diavolo	1897	1897	1
Serria	La campana dell'eremitaggio	1897	1897	1
De Ferrari	Pipelet	1897	1897	1
Flotow	Martha	1899	1899	1
Pedrotti	Tutti in maschera	1899	1899	1
Falchi	Il trillo del diavolo	1899	1899	1
Verdi	I Lombardi alla prima crociata	1901	1901	1
Leoncavallo	Zazà	1903	1903	1
Varèse	Nerina	1904	1904	1
Zanetti	Madre	1904	1904	1
Donizetti	Poliuto	1905	1905	1
Montemezzi	Giovanni Gallurese	1905	1905	1
Meyerbeer	L'africana	1907	1907	1
Mascagni	Silvano	1908	1908	1
Massenet	La navarraise	1908	1908	1
Alfano	Risurrezione	1910	1910	1
Wolf-Ferrari	Le donne curiose	1913	1913	1
Berlioz	La damnation de Faust	1913	1913	1
Pacini	Saffo	1913	1913	1
Viscardini	Orma	1914	1914	1
Bondonio	Sulle rive del Danubio	1920	1920	1
Bondonio	Antigone	1920	1920	1
Mascagni	Lodoletta	1923	1923	1
Wagner	Die Walküre	1924	1924	1
Vittadini	Anima allegra	1926	1926	1
Puccini	Suor Angelica	1927	1927	1
Puccini	Gianni Schicchi	1927	1927	1
Pergolesi	La serva padrona	1928	1928	1
Trentinaglia	Rosmunda	1928	1928	1
Rossini	Guglielmo Tell	1928	1928	1
Saint-Saëns	Samson et Dalila	1929	1929	1
Rossini	Il viaggio a Reims	2015	2015	1
Verdi	Don Carlo	1980	1980	1

== Premio Guido Cantelli ==
On 3 October 1961, the first edition of the Cantelli Awards took place in the Coccia theatre. This competition, which was won by numerous world-famous conductors, ran until 1980.

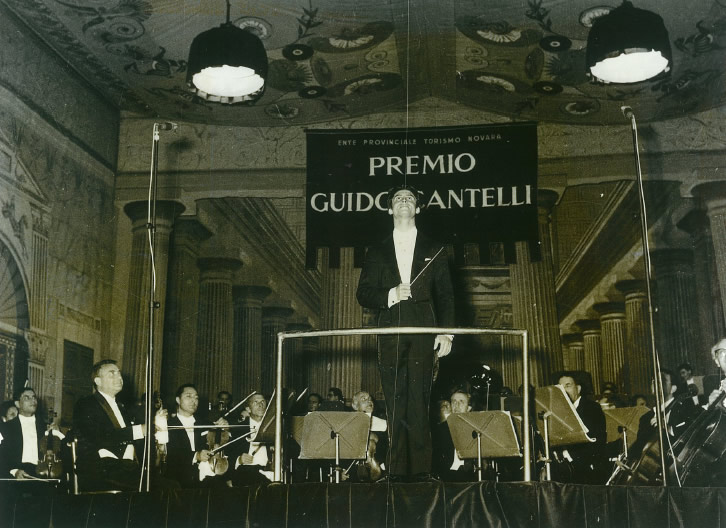
Riccardo Muti, winner of the 1967 Cantelli Award, Teatro Coccia

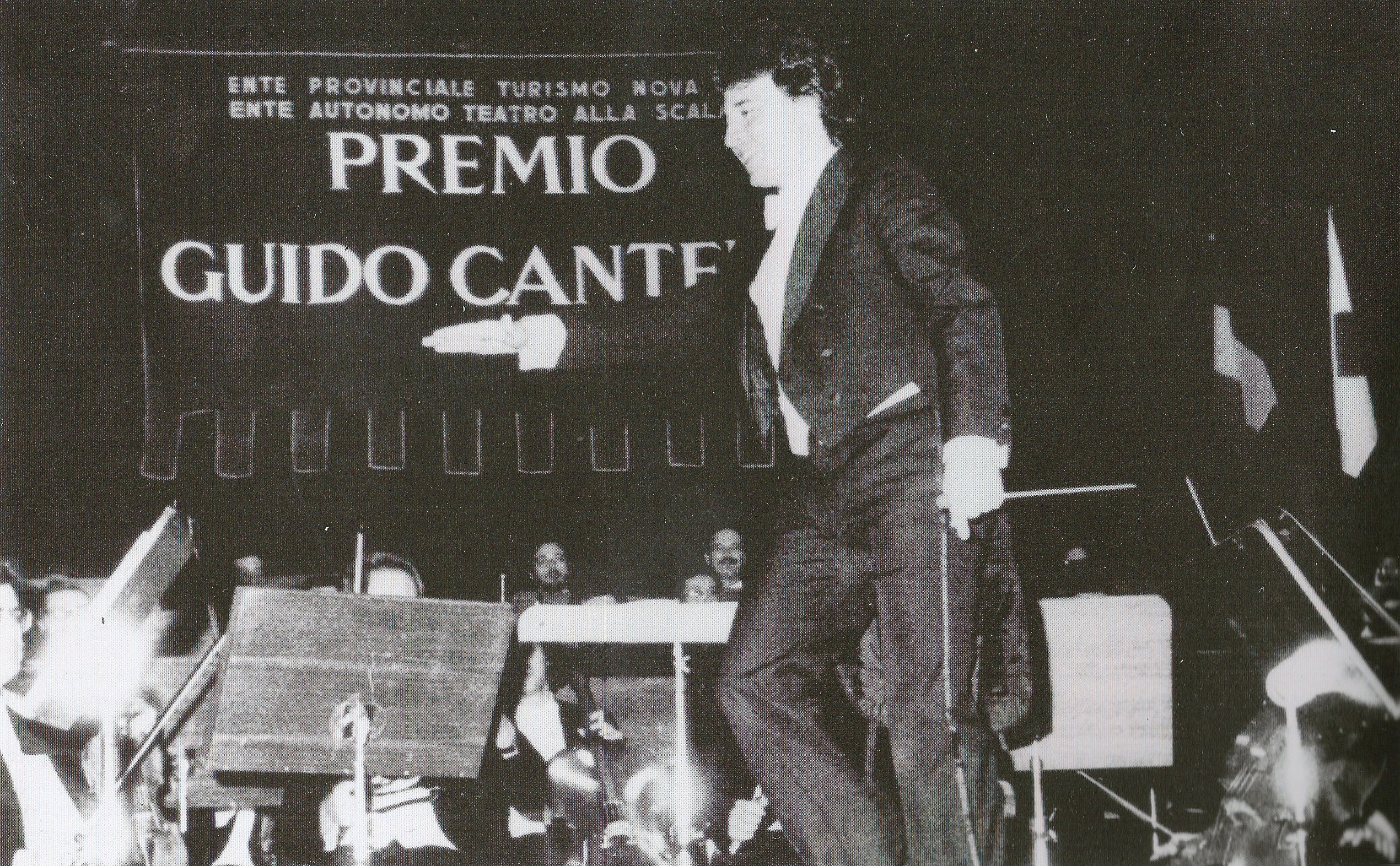
Donato Renzetti, winner of the 1980 Cantelli Award, Teatro Coccia

Edition	Year	Award	Winner	Orchestra
1	1961	I winner	Hermann Michael	I Pomeriggi musicali
2	1963	I winner	Eliahu Inbal	Orchestra del Teatro alla Scala
3	1965	I winner	Walter Gilessen	Orchestra del Teatro alla Scala
4	1967	I winner	Riccardo Muti	Orchestra del Teatro alla Scala
5	1969	I winner	James Frazier	Orchestra del Teatro alla Scala
6	1971	I winner	Inoue Michiyoshi	Orchestra del Teatro alla Scala
7	1973	II winners (Ex aequo)	Ádám Fischer, Lothar Zagrosek	Orchestra del Teatro alla Scala
8	1975	I winner	Hubert Soudant	Orchestra del Teatro alla Scala
9	1977	I winner	Wojciech Michniewski	Orchestra del Teatro alla Scala
10	1980	I winner	Donato Renzetti	Orchestra del Teatro alla Scala

== Gallery ==
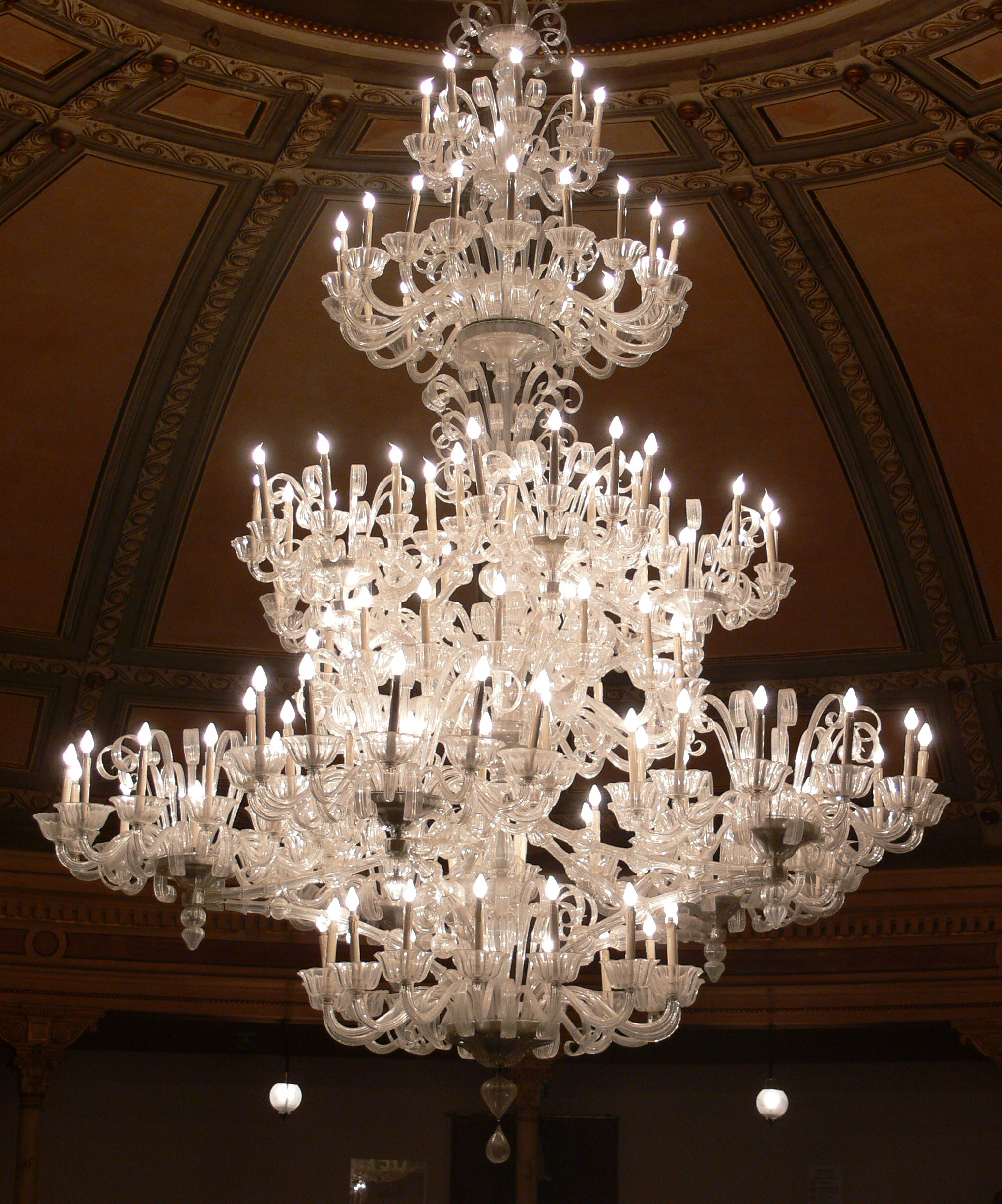
Chandelier

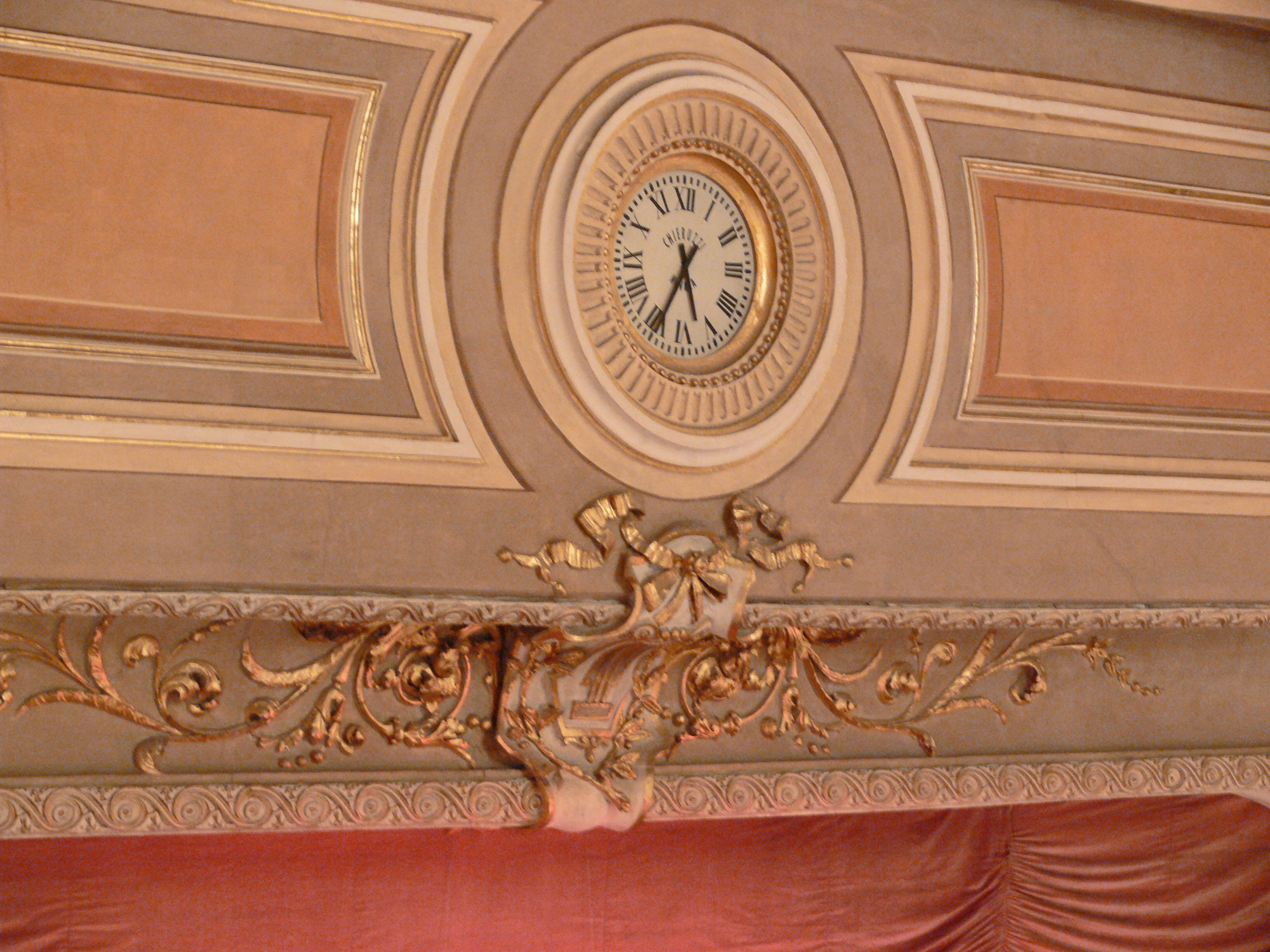
Clock

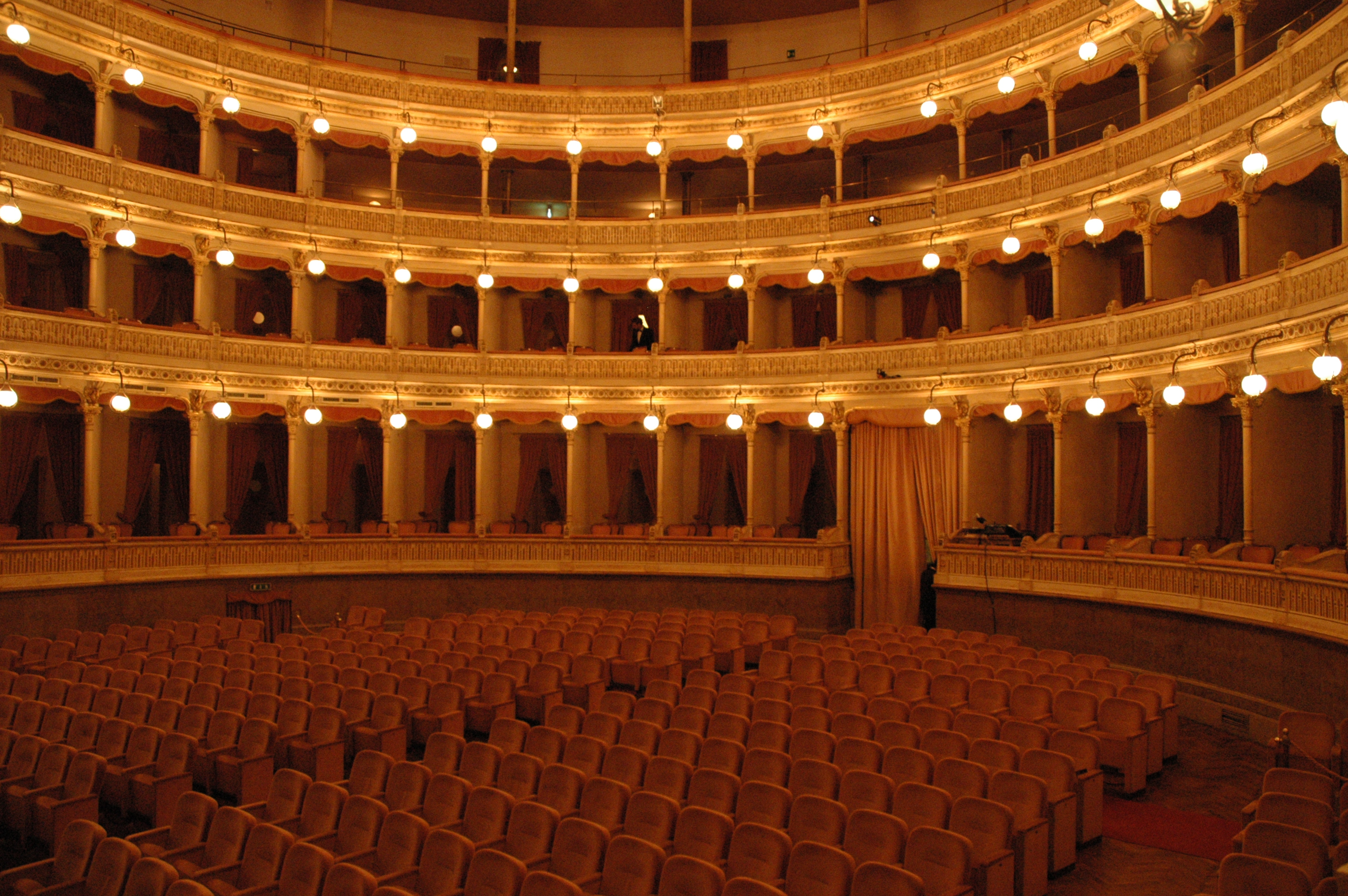
Side view of the hall

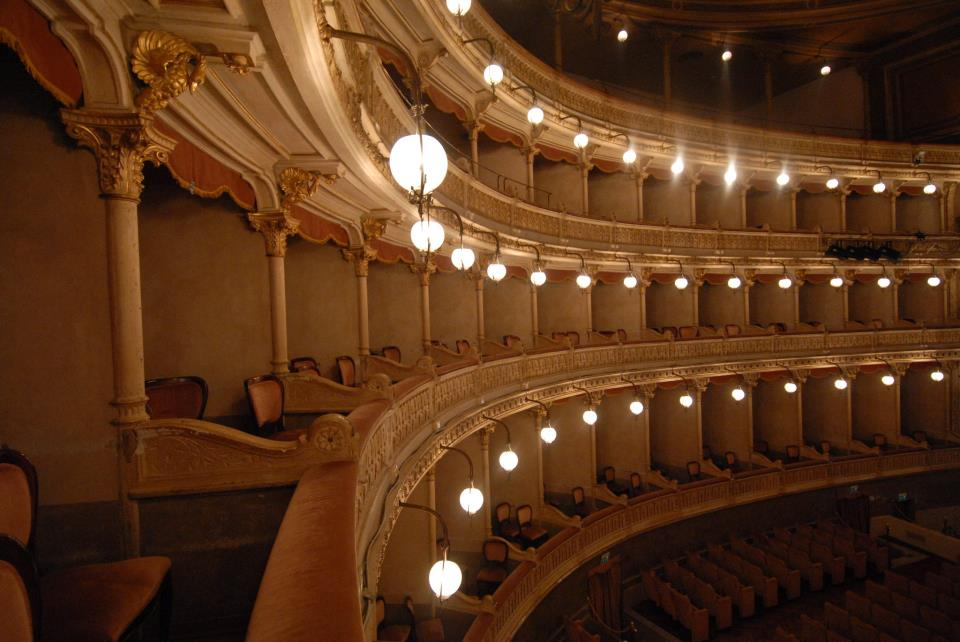
Antlers

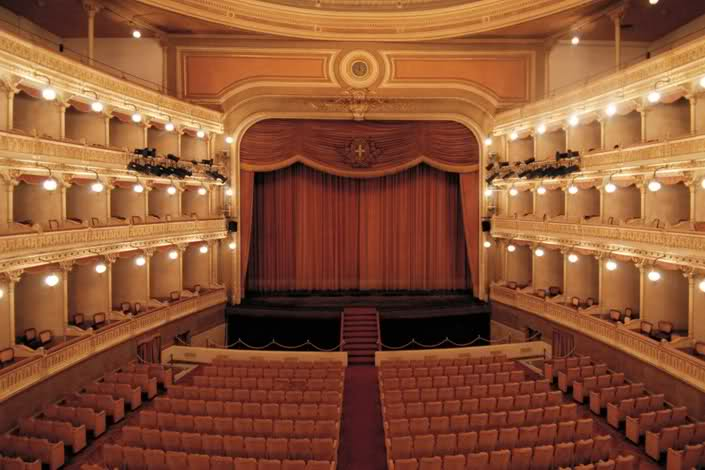
View from the second tier of the boxes

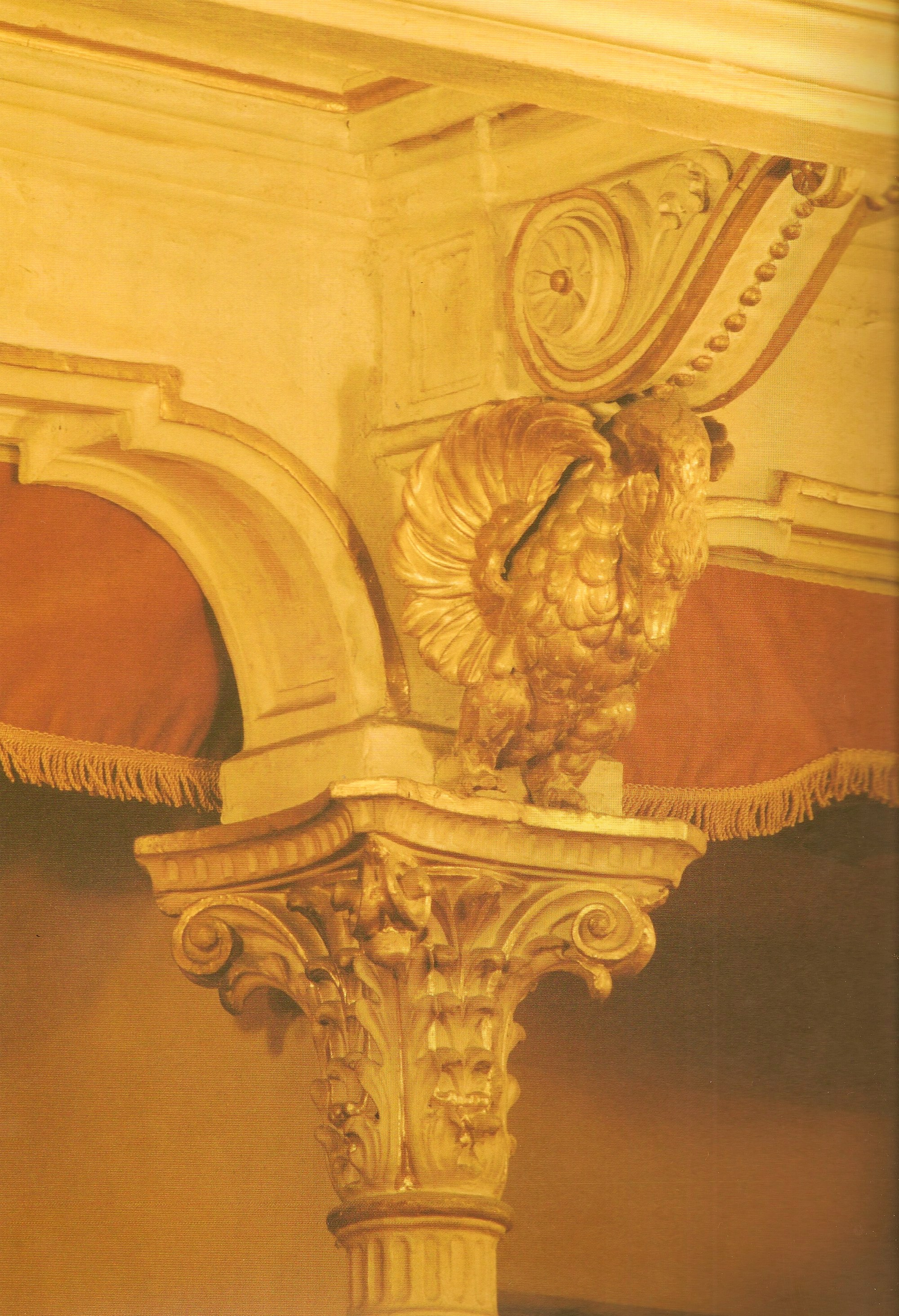
Capital of the boxes

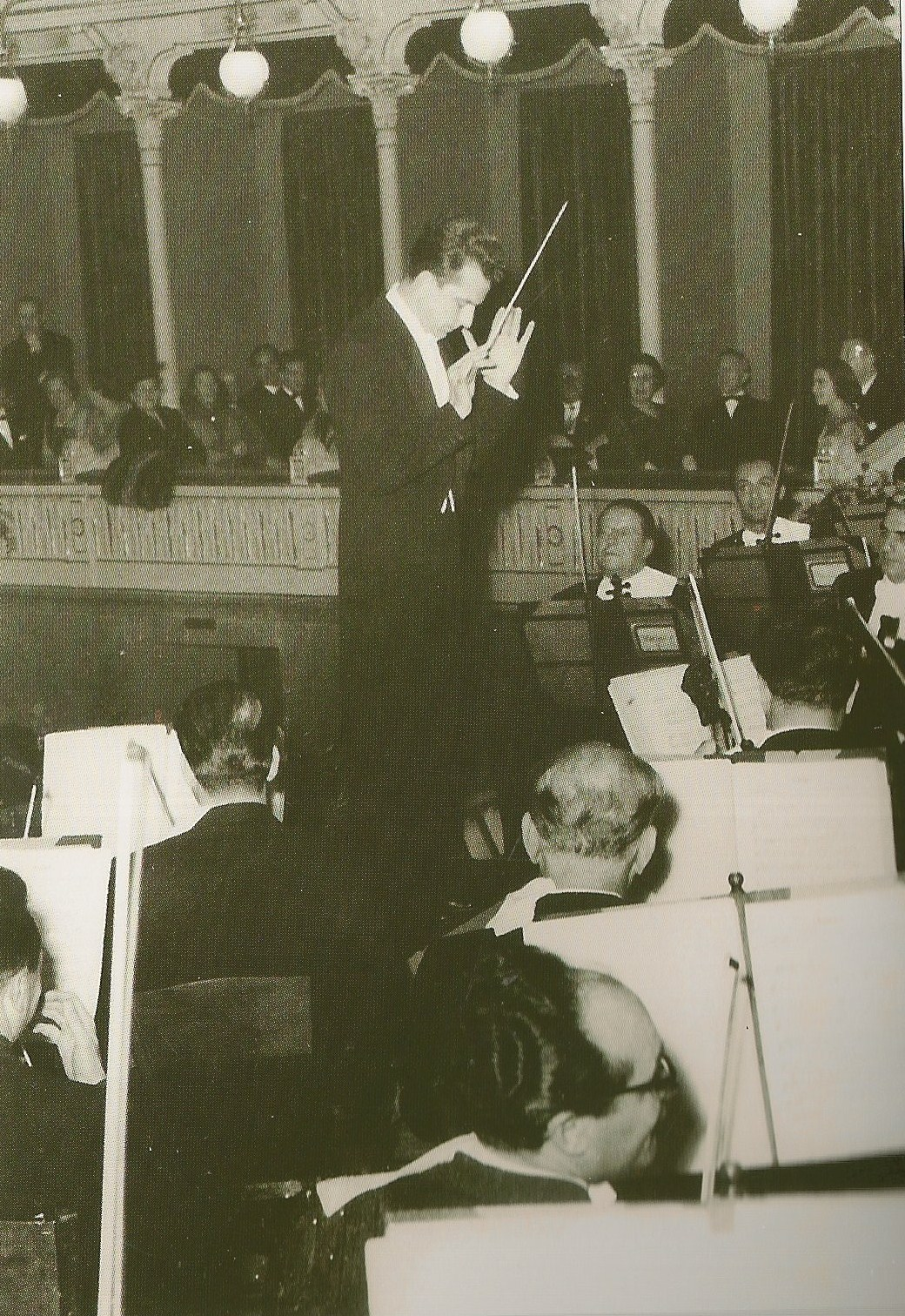
Last concert by Guido Cantelli, 17 November 1956, Teatro Coccia in Novara, Orchestra of the Teatro alla Scala

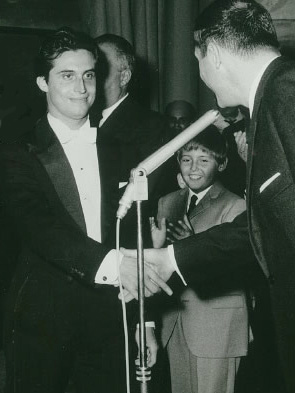
Riccardo Muti, Cantelli Award, Teatro Coccia of Novara, 1967
