= Guido Cantelli =

Italian conductor (1920–1956)

Guido Cantelli, c. 1953

Guido Cantelli (Italian: [ˈɡwi.do kanˈtɛl.li]; 27 April 1920 – 24 November 1956) was an Italian orchestral conductor. Toscanini elected him his "spiritual heir" after witnessing him conduct at La Scala, Milan in May 1948. He was named music director of La Scala in November 1956, but his promising career was cut short only one week later by his death at the age of 36 in the 1956 Paris DC-6 crash in France en route to the United States.

Known for his luminous musicality, attention to detail, perfectionism and rigorous structural fidelity, Cantelli was considered in his time one of the most promising conductors in the world, and is credited as one of the most talented in history.

In 1961, the Cantelli Awards, an international music competition, was founded in Italy in Cantelli's honour. The competition has since grown to become one of the most prestigious competitions for conductors in the world.

== Biography ==
=== Early years ===
Cantelli was born on 27 April 1920 in Novara, Italy, to Antonio, bandmaster of the Seventeenth Artillery Regiment, at the time stationed in Novara, and Angela (née Riccardone). He had a brother, Giuseppe, seven years his senior. He started studying music while still very young. A gifted child, Cantelli first directed the choir of the Basilica of San Gaudenzio in his native Novara at 8 years old. By the age of 10, he had written his first Mass and was at times appearing as the organist, even "playing themes from Tristan und Isolde during services", as well as occasionally conducting his father's band. At about 7 he started to play the piano, often playing in a trio consisting of himself on piano, his older brother on violin and a friend on cello, debuting as a pianist at age 14. From 1939 until 1941 he studied with Arrigo Pedrollo, and then, from 1941 until 1942, with Giorgio Federico Ghedini and Antonino Votto. He graduated from the Milan Conservatory in 1943.

=== Career ===
In 1940, Cantelli began a promising conducting career. In 1943, he garnered acclaim for a representation of La traviata at the Teatro Coccia. Besides being the conductor, Cantelli was also the artistic director of the representation. In the same season he also conducted a Madama Butterfly, a second Traviata, and Massenet's Werther.

Cantelli's career was interrupted by World War II, during which he was called to serve in the Italian army, but then unexpectedly placed in a German labour camp for unclear reasons. (Note: Some sources cite Cantelli's alleged outspoken opposition to (Italian) Fascism, others his opposition to Nazi principles, while others claim he was deported by the Nazis as a weak conscript, and possibly never even asked to fight. His biographer Laurence Lewis stated that though "previous comments about Cantelli's deportation state categorically that he was deported as an anti-fascist", the Germans, in desperate need of manual workers, in fact simply offered the Italians the choice of either fighting with them against the Allies or a sentence in a labour camp. Cantelli, like all young Italians, belonged to the Fascist youth movement, participating in its cultural programme. He further wrote and signed a virtually compulsory declaration of belonging to the Aryan race. After the establishment of the Republic of Salo, a Nazi puppet state, and his internment in Germany, upon his return to Italy he worked in a bank, where he forged documents for his friend Sergio Scarpa, who worked for the Partisans. Lewis specifies that Cantelli never fought for the partisans himself. He had been called to service by the Italian Army in February 1943, but was released by the army due to health concerns. In September 1943, he was again called to arms by then Nazi-led Italy, and soon found himself in a Nazi labour camp in Germany. When the Nazis offered repatriation to Italian labourers in exchange for service in Mussolini's Republic of Salo troops, Cantelli accepted, but fell seriously ill on the way back, and was sent to a hospital in Bolzano by the Germans. The hospital couldn't offer proper treatment and lacked proper living conditions, and Cantelli was helped to retreat to Novara by the local chaplain. Upon his return to Italy and during his employment at the bank, Cantelli lived quite openly and never under an assumed name.) He was sent with a team of labourers to Frankfurt am Main. While in Germany, Cantelli was interned in a concentration camp in Szczecin. He was then offered repatriation in exchange for fighting for Mussolini's Republic of Salo. Cantelli accepted, but fell seriously ill on the way back—by this time his weight had dropped to a "dangerously low level", possibly around 80 pounds (36 kilograms). Thus, the Germans sent him to a hospital near Bolzano. He was later helped to escape from the hospital to Novara by the local chaplain, who provided him with "a bicycle, clothes, and money". He reached Novara between late 1943 and early 1944, later establishing himself in Turin. Cantelli then picked up a job at a bank processing cheques. He slowly restarted his musical career, directing La bohème in Biella in March 1944, and La traviata, Madama Butterfly, and Werther at the Teatro Coccia in Novara in April and May 1944. His health was still so poor at this time that he often needed support to reach the podium.

After resuming his musical career in Turin, Cantelli was invited to conduct some concerts with the Symphony Orchestra of the Radio of Milan (Orchestra sinfonica della Radio di Milano). Riccardo Pick-Mangiagalli, the director of the Milan Conservatory, decided it was the moment to present the young conductor to the wider public, organizing a concert at the Rocchetta Court of the Castello Sforzesco on 27 July 1945, entrusting to Cantelli the Orchestra of La Scala. The programme was very proving, and included, among other things, Pyotr Ilyich Tchaikovsky's Symphony No. 6, or Pathétique Symphony. The performance immediately signalled Cantelli's "innate elegance of the gesture, the interpretative strength and stylistic purity, which, animated by the youthful momentum of the young conductor, made a great impression on the public."

Iris Cantelli, Arturo Toscanini (centre), and Guido Cantelli (right). Toscanini considered Guido Cantelli his natural heir.

After the success of the Castello Sforzesco concert, a successful international career started for Cantelli. In August 1945, he conducted the orchestra of the Italian Radio (RAI). Though Cantelli had little time to prepare a new program, opting to repeat Tchaikovsky's No. 6 from his Castello Sforzesco performance with La Scala, the broadcast was nonetheless viewed as a success. In the same month, he conducted the Orchestra of Santa Cecilia for the first time, at the Basilica of Maxentius in Rome. In September 1946, he conducted a symphonic concert together with Ildebrando Pizzetti at La Fenice in Venice, where in November of the same year he conducted Schumann's Cello Concerto (with Enrico Mainardi), and La valse by Maurice Ravel, and in December Beethoven's Symphony No. 1. He would return to direct two concerts at La Fenice in April 1948. In November 1946, Cantelli also directed the Maggio Musicale Fiorentino in Florence, while in 1947 he collaborated with Combined Service Entertainment, providing music for British troops in Italy—which had remained behind after liberation to assist in the task of reconstruction—receiving a standing ovation after each concert.

Cantelli was acclaimed by the public and the critics alike. However, in spite of all the compliments and the success, his attention was not diverted from his studies. He kept on studying with "scrupulous commitment and professionalism." The results of these stylistic studies by Cantelli matured on 21 May 1948, with a concert that, in a way, "marked his definitive Scaliger consecration and at the same time his authoritative entry into the small number of great international conductors." Arturo Toscanini was present in the audience and was astonished by Cantelli, allegedly exclaiming, in the middle of the concert, "That's me!". Within days, Toscanini "was in the Cantellis' tiny Milan apartment, playing his latest record" and inviting Cantelli to guest conduct his NBC Symphony Orchestra in 1949.

Cantelli arrived in New York on board the Vulcania, having sailed from Genoa, in December 1948. He debuted with the NBC Symphony Orchestra on 15 January 1949, with works such as Haydn's Symphony No. 93 and Hindemith's Mathis der Maler. His concerts were a sensation, and they were all broadcast. In a note written to Cantelli's wife Iris in 1950 after four of these concerts, Toscanini said:

I am happy and moved to inform you of Guido's great success and that I introduced him to my orchestra, which loves him as I do. This is the first time in my long career that I have met a young man so gifted. He will go far, very far.

On 3 January 1952, Cantelli was welcomed again by the American public, conducting the New York Philharmonic. Between these two dates, he had been welcomed in Edinburgh (1950), and had completed an acclaimed tournée in London.

Cantelli, who had started his career very young in 1940, and was already performing in the greatest theatres in Europe and America by 1945, had, in the course of his brief career, conducted not only in many of the most famous concert halls of Europe but also in the United States and South Africa. Besides conducting the NBC Symphony from 1949 to 1954, Cantelli also guest conducted the New York Philharmonic and the Boston Symphony Orchestra in the U.S. and the Philharmonia Orchestra in the UK.

While he was conducting in America and Europe and garnering acclaim there, Cantelli "also continued his triumphal career in his homeland". After dedicating himself for a long time to symphonic music, he wanted to return to the "lyric repertoire". The result of such decision was a memorable Così fan tutte conducted by Cantelli at the Piccola Scala on 27 January 1956. Cantelli, besides conducting, was also the director of the opera, the cast of which included such prominent names as Elisabeth Schwarzkopf and Graziella Sciutti. The opera had a triumphal outcome, and it nothing but confirmed Cantelli's "exceptional directorial abilities." The opera was repeated in Johannesburg, where it came to an "equally sensational success."

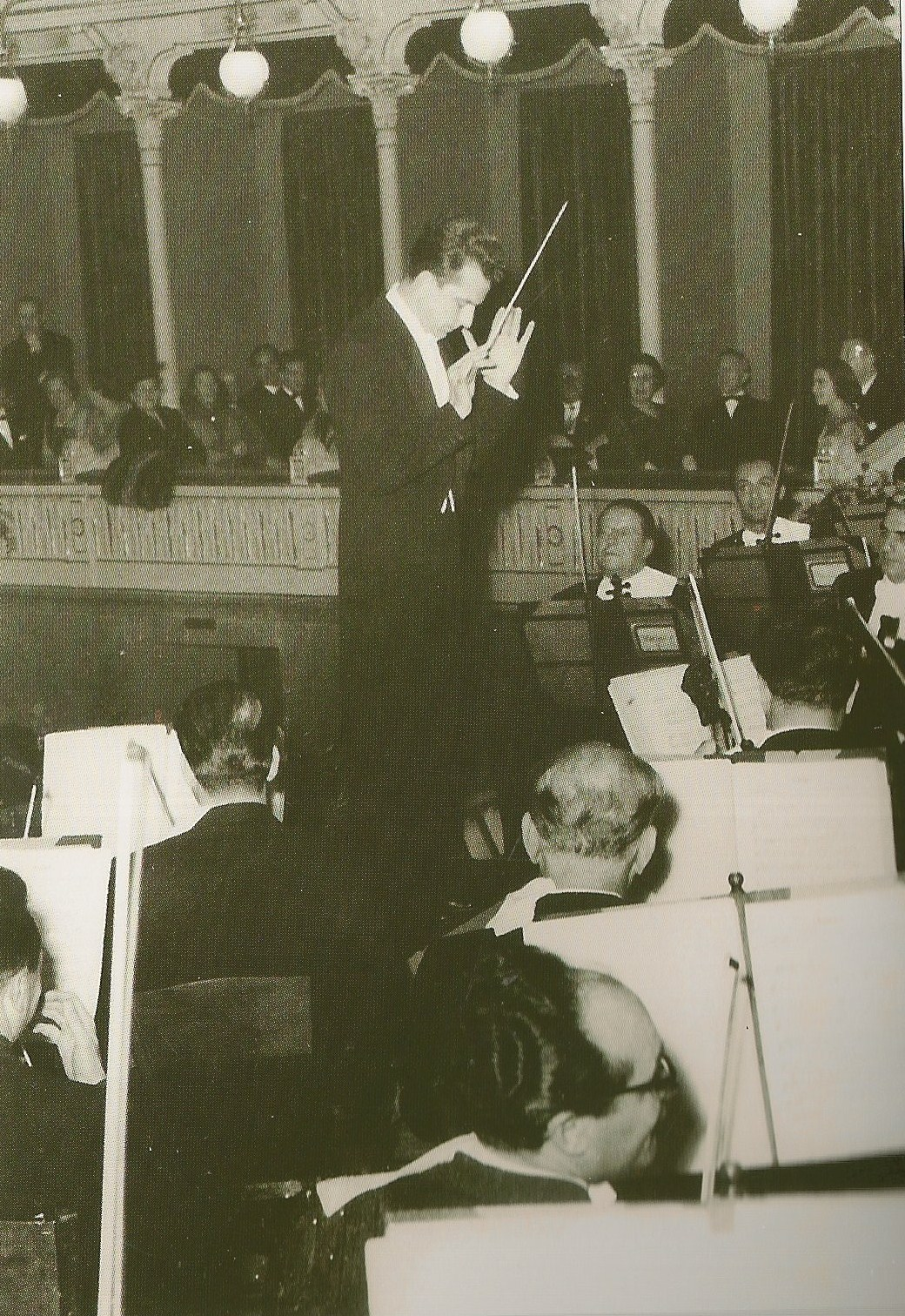
17 November 1956, Teatro Coccia in Novara

Cantelli was named Musical Director of La Scala on 16 November 1956. He was called in the United States to conduct a series of concerts with the New York Philharmonic Orchestra, but tragedy struck. Cantelli died in the crash of LAI Flight 451 at Orly Airport in Paris, France only a week after he was named director of La Scala, on 24 November. He was 36 years old. Toscanini, who was in failing health and died less than two months later, was not informed of Cantelli's death.

At the time of his death, Cantelli was being considered as the next music director of the New York Philharmonic, as successor to Dimitri Mitropoulos; instead, Leonard Bernstein (who also guest conducted the NBC Symphony) was appointed conductor of the Philharmonic in 1958.

A "sensible and refined artist", Cantelli is remembered as a "living presence in the Italian music world", especially as an "admirable example of professional seriousness, whose artistic commitment was constantly aimed at achieving a severe and unquenchable stylistic perfection". Cantelli had a strong will, and character endowments that enhanced his communicative skills and magnetism. He had a wide repertory, that he always conducted from memory even during rehearsals. He performed "a very rigorous systematic analysis, noting the salient phrases of each composition in the margins of each score, also specifying rhythmic characteristics and interpretative aspects".

Massimo Mila stated that for Cantelli "conducting was a peremptory and absolute vocation, an inexorable determination", which allowed him, in a short time, to size "the most recondite secrets of the art of conducting, and to reach a surprising artistic maturity very soon". He studied with the greatest, learning their secrets and benefiting from their experience, yet never imitating anyone, "manifesting without hesitation his artistic personality", entering, in each execution, in an "almost supernatural state that isolated him from the surrounding world".

Cantelli was made "one of the most representative figures in the contemporary directorial panorama" by the aforementioned gifts along with, among other things, his communicative skills with the orchestra and the public, the natural "limpidity" of his gesture, his magnetism, and his interpretative versatility. Cantelli was indeed considered the living heir of Toscanini, who compared his "intense, lyrical interpretations" to his own, electing him as his "spiritual heir".

=== Performances and recordings ===
Cantelli left a small legacy of commercial and live recordings. Among these are recordings of Beethoven's 7th symphony (ASD 254) and 5th piano concerto (with Walter Gieseking and the New York Philharmonic Orchestra in Carnegie Hall from 25 March 1956), Symphony No. 29 (Mozart) on HMV's ALP 1461, Schubert's 8th symphony (ALP 1325), Brahms' 1st (ALP 1152) and 3rd symphonies (BLP 1083), Franck's D minor symphony (ALP 1219 mono issue) (with the NBC Symphony in Carnegie Hall in stereo from 6 April 1954), Mussorgsky's Pictures at an Exhibition, Paul Hindemith's Symphony: Mathis der Maler, Liszt's 2nd piano concerto with Claudio Arrau, and shorter pieces by Ravel (ALP 1207), Rossini, and others. He recorded Vivaldi's The Four Seasons with the New York Philharmonic for Columbia Records. He also recorded a performance of Tchaikovsky's Pathétique Symphony with The Philharmonia Orchestra [HMV].

His one surviving opera performance is a Così fan tutte, from La Scala in 1956. There is also a live recording of the Verdi Requiem (with Herva Nelli). He conducted the Mozart Requiem at La Scala in 1950. There are live recordings with the New York Philharmonic of Beethoven's first and fifth piano concertos, with Rudolf Serkin as soloist, from 1953 and 1954, respectively.

The Franck, Brahms 3rd, Schubert 8th, and Beethoven 7th symphonies were among his few stereo recordings. Just before his death, Cantelli recorded the final three movements of Beethoven's Symphony No. 5 in stereo for EMI, but did not record the first movement, due to a construction project outside London's Kingsway Hall. In recent years, many performances from broadcasts and recording sessions with the NBC Symphony, from 1949 to 1954, have been made available.

== Legacy ==
There are streets named after Cantelli in several Italian cities, and in Brazil (São Paulo city's South Zone). In 1998, Novara's city conservatory was named after him.

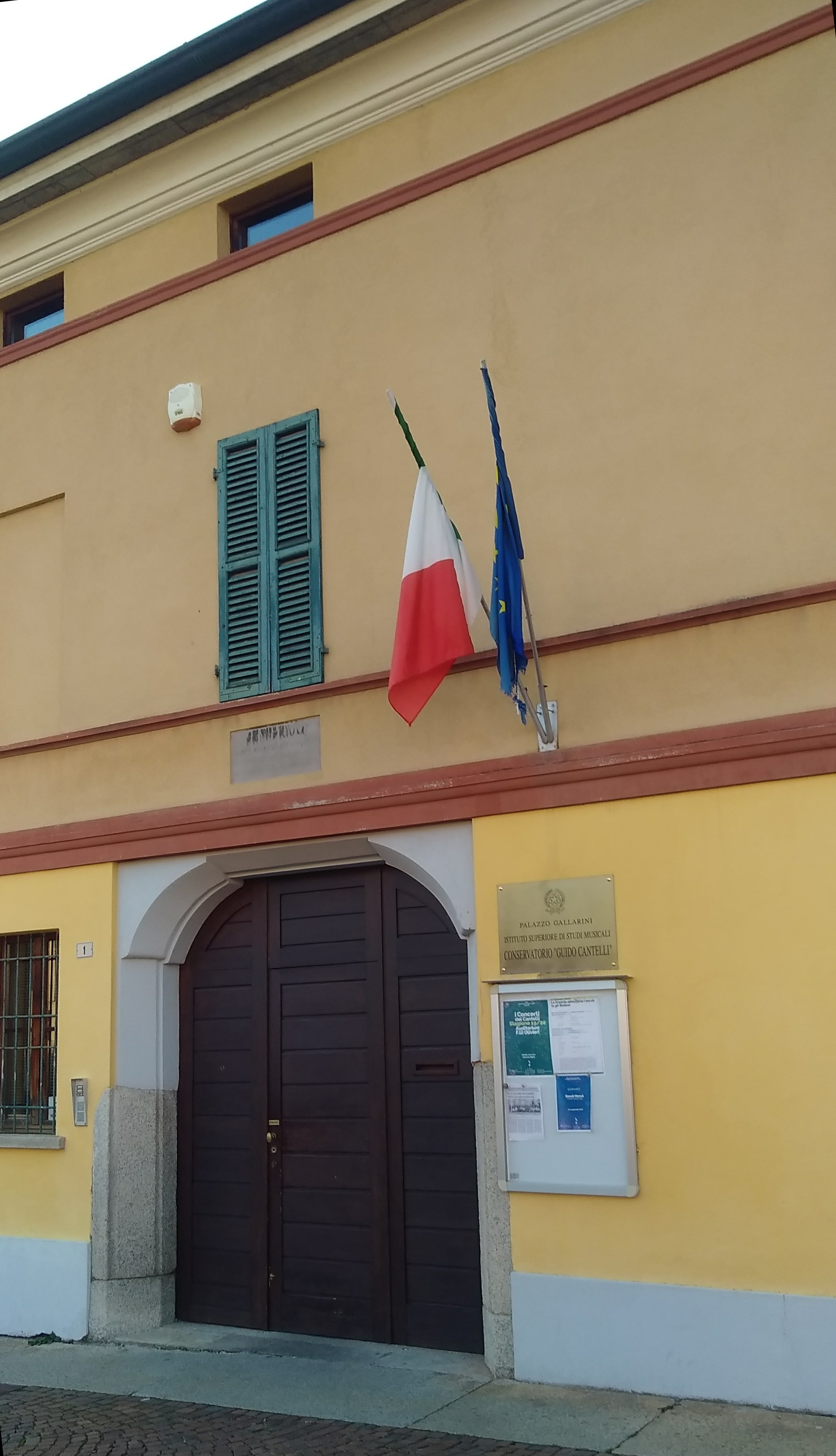
The Guido Cantelli Conservatory in Novara.

In 2020, a 10-disc set, with remastered LP-era tracks of Cantelli's studio recordings was released by Warner. Though his recording career was short, Cantelli nonetheless left behind a precious series of recordings. Jessica Duchen, writing for BBC Music Magazine, placed Cantelli's recording of Tchaikovsky's Romeo and Juliet among the best recordings of the work, describing it as one of the most inspiring ever versions thereof. Cantelli's recording of Vivaldi's The Four Seasons with the New York Philharmonic has remained a "perennially popular historical recording". Bruce Eder, writing for Apple Music, stated that the quality of Cantelli's interpretation of Debussy's orchestral music has seldom been rivalled. Cantelli's radio broadcasts with groups including the Philharmonic and the NBC Symphony have been restored and released by labels including Testament Records, Music & Arts, and Pristine.

A documentary titled Guido Cantelli. Il figlio degli dei, directed by Alessandro Turci, was telecast on Sky Italia's Sky Classica in November 2016. On Italy's Liberation Day 2026, an episode of Momus – Il caffè dell'Opera titled "The Talent of Guido Cantelli" (Il talento di Guido Cantelli) aired on Rai Radio 3.

In 1961, the Cantelli Awards were established in Cantelli's name. Widely regarded as one of the most prestigious international conducting competitions and a "stepping stone for rising conductors", the awards recognize excellence in conducting, honouring the best young conductor at the international level. Awarded biennially, the Cantelli Award was won by many notable conductors at the beginning of their careers, including Riccardo Muti, Eliahu Inbal, Ádám Fischer and Lothar Zagrosek.

== Views ==
Due to Cantelli's internment in Germany at the hands of the Nazis, after the latter's occupation of Novara and the establishment of the Republic of Salo, his figure has been promoted as that of an antifascist, both in Italy and abroad. Cantelli's biographer Laurence Lewis, however, describes him as apolitical. Like all young Italians, Cantelli belonged to the Fascist youth movement, also participating in its cultural programme. He was called up to the Italian Army for military service first in February 1943 but was rejected by the army due to his poor health. After being interned in Germany by the Nazis for unclear reasons, he returned to Italy, where he worked at a bank. During this time, he forged some documents for his friend Sergio Scarpa, who was at the time with the Partisans. However, Lewis specifies that Cantelli himself never fought for the Partisans.

== Personal life ==
Cantelli's wife was Iris Cantelli, née Bilucaglia, the daughter of a noted Istrian Italian paediatrician and obstetrician, who had to leave his native land in the Istrian-Dalmatian exodus. She was portrayed by Valentina Chico in Larry Weinstein's 2008 film Toscanini in His Own Words, starring Michael Brandon and Barry Jackson.

Cantelli and Bilucaglia had a son together, Leonardo, who was but 5 months old at the time of his father's death.

== Notes ==
Cultural offices
Preceded by Carlo Maria Giulini	Musical Directors, La Scala, Milan; 1956	Succeeded by Claudio Abbado
