= Conservatorio Guido Cantelli =

College of music in Novara, Italy

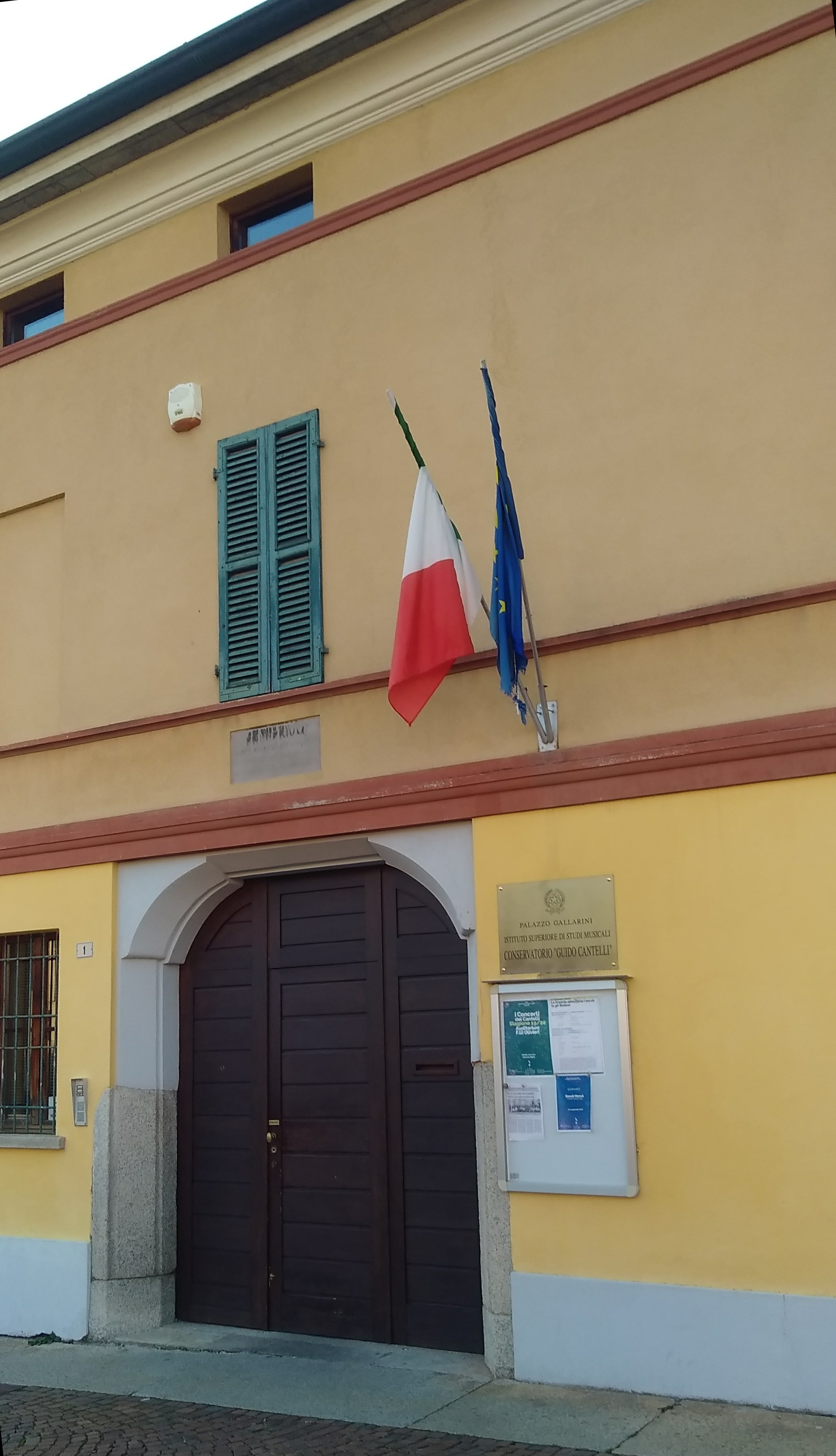
- Entrance of the Conservatorio
- Established: 1996; 30 years ago
- Location: Via Collegio Gallarini, 1, Novara, Italy; 45°26′40.81″N 8°37′12.27″E
- Website: www.consno.it

The Conservatorio Guido Cantelli (in full: I.S.S.M. Conservatorio Guido Cantelli di Novara) is a college of music in Novara, Italy. The college opened in 1766, and was established in a building built in the 1700s. It became Novara's conservatory in 1996, and it was named after Novara's great conductor Guido Cantelli.

The Conservatorio Cantelli hosts the music festival "Festival Fiati", which in 2019 celebrated its 16th edition.

== History ==
The building originally built in the 1700s was once known as the casone or ospedale degli spagnoli. The building served as a hospital and then it became a boarding school. The Gallarini family (Francesco Antonio and his father Antonio Maria) founded an institution to help teach young people in the region. Antonio Maria disposed in his will that after his death a "perpetual" college be established in Sillavengo. The executor found it difficult to do so in such a place, and instead chose Novara. However, to make such a change, they needed a special authorization. To obtain the necessary derogation to switch the place where the college was to be created the executor, Francesco Antonio Gallarini, who was also the son of Gallarini, as well as a priest, wrote a letter to Pope Benedict XIV. In 1755, the Pope gave his assent. In 1766 the bishop Aurelio Balbis Bertone gave the casone―the building of the present-day conservatorio―to Gallarini. The building was restored the same year. Between 1831 and 1855 the palace was restored again. The colored tiles, architectural elements such as balconies, aedicules with statuettes, spire pinnacles, and the terracotta decorations on the facade were added between 1854 and 1905 by the rector Ercole Marietti, who dabbled in architecture. In 1880 a dormitory was built (which today is the conservatorio's auditorium). During World War I, the college was used as a military hospital, while in 1945 it was used by the partisans. The building suffered a period of decay, but then it was renovated between 1982 and 1986.

== See also ==
- Teatro Coccia
- Guido Cantelli
