= Cantelli Awards =

Award for excellence in conducting

- Premio Guido Cantelli
- Awarded for: Excellence in conducting
- Country: Italy
- First award: 3 October 1961; 65 years ago
- Website: premiocantelli.it

The Cantelli Award (Italian: Premio Guido Cantelli) recognizes excellence in conducting. The prize was first awarded on 3 October 1961. The awards were hosted at the Teatro Coccia, in Novara, where also all the other editions were hosted. The prestigious prize was won, among others, by Ádám Fischer, Lothar Zagrosek, and Riccardo Muti, who was the first Italian conductor to win the prize. Many winners of the prize went on to become prominent conductors.

The awards were created in honour of Guido Cantelli, a noted Italian conductor, Italy's greatest talent in conducting in his time, and a protégée of Arturo Toscanini. On 23 November 1958, Cantelli, who by then had become director of La Scala and was performing in the world's greatest theaters and orchestra, died in an airplane clash in Paris, France. Five years later, the Premio Cantelli was established in Novara―the place of birth of the maestro, and where he held his last concert.

Held biennially, this competition, which was won by numerous world famous conductors, ran until 1980. There were a total of 10 editions between 1961 and 1980. In 2020, after a long pause, the awards were revived in occasion of the centenary of Cantelli's birth, with the Cantelli Award celebrating its eleventh edition.

== Award categories ==
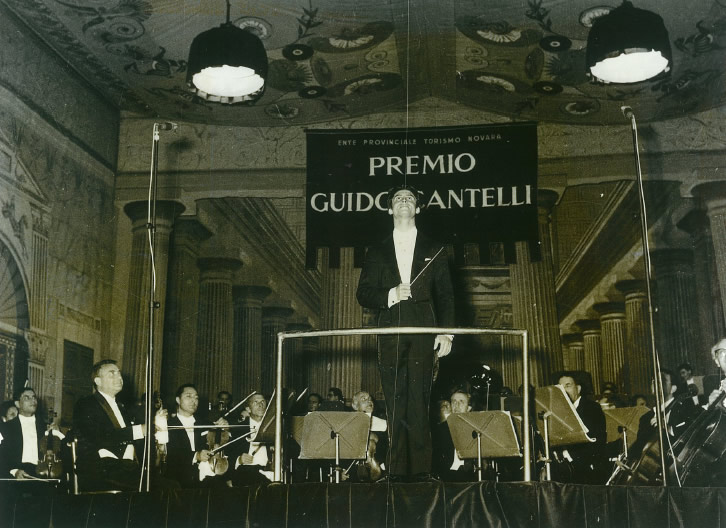
Riccardo Muti won the Cantelli Award in 1967

As of 2020, the awards had six categories. The First Prize, granted by the Fondazione Teatro Coccia; the Critics Award, granted by the Fondazione Banca Popolare di Novara; the Town's Award, which in 2020 was conferred by the Councillor for Culture of the City of Novara, the president of the Associazione Amici della Musica Vittorio Cocito and the director of the Guido Cantelli Conservatory; the Teatro Regio of Torino Orchestra Award, granted by the members of the Teatro Regio and supported by Amici del Regio; the Youth Award and the Made in Italy Award―conferred by the president of the Teatro Coccia foundation and by the latter's director. The 2020 jury for the Critics Award was composed of Enrico Girardi (Il Corriere della Sera), Angelo Foletto (La Repubblica), Elvio Giudici (Il Giorno), Alberto Mattioli (La Stampa), and Carla Moreni (Il Sole 24 Ore). Further, artistic contracts to conduct concerts are awarded. These are offered by the Fondazione Teatro Coccia, the Teatro Regio Turin, Parma's Fondazione Arturo Toscanini, the Orchestra della Toscana (ORT), Venice's Teatro La Fenice, the Tucson Symphony Orchestra, the Vienna Radio Symphony Orchestra (ORF), the Monte-Carlo Philharmonic Orchestra, the Rossini in Wildbad – Belcanto Opera Festival.

=== Categories ===
- Premio Cantelli, the First Prize
- Critics Award
- Town's Award
- Teatro Regio of Torino Orchestra Award
- Youth Award
- Made in Italy Award
- Contracts

== History ==
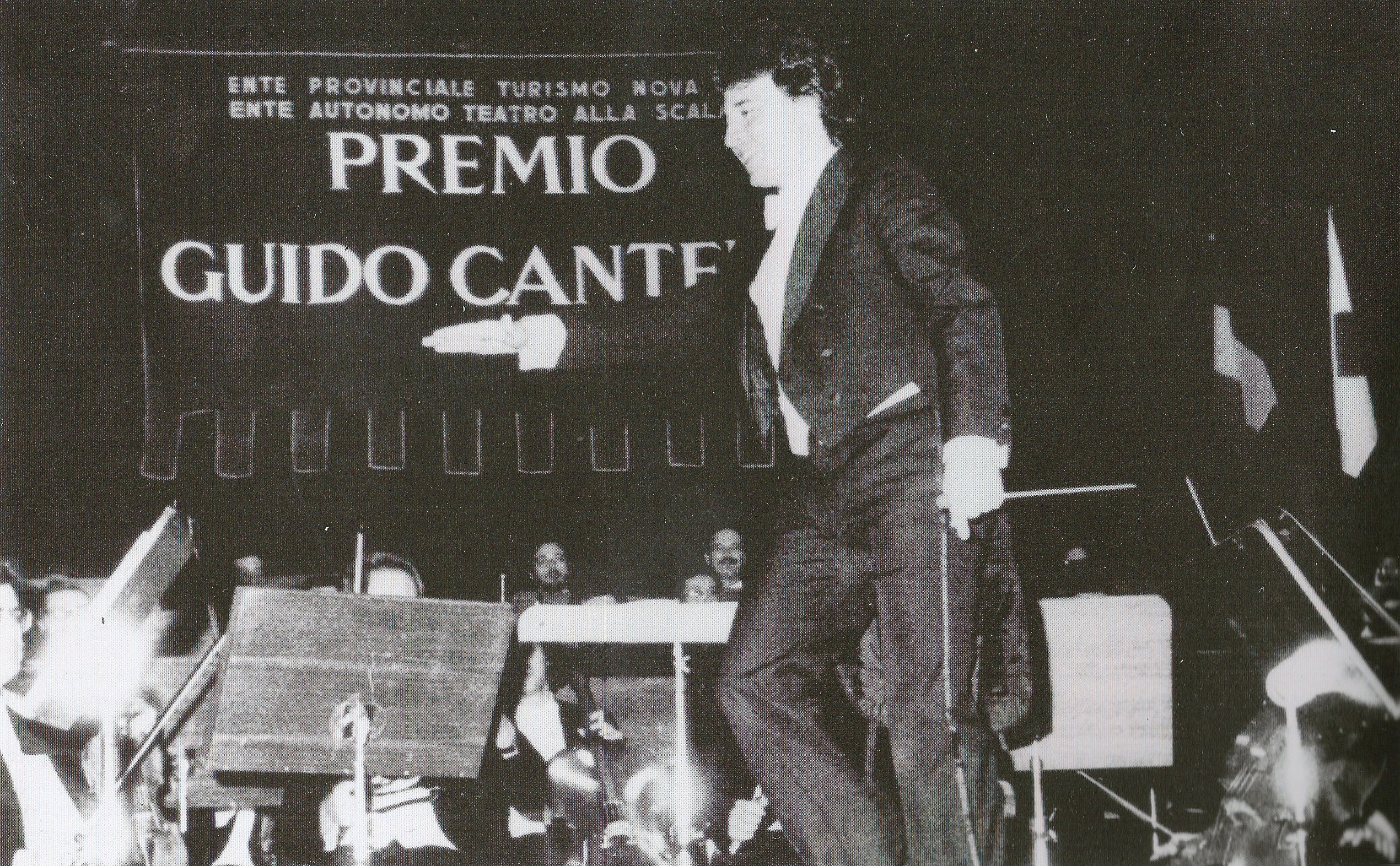
Donato Renzetti was the last winner of the Cantelli Award before the awards' revival in 2020

Historically, the purpose of the awards was recognizing the greatest talent in conducting, more specifically, the best young conductors less than 35 years of age. The prize once included 5,000,000 lire, a gold medal, a diploma, and a contract to conduct a concert at La Scala.

In November 1956, Guido Cantelli, at the time the leading Italian conductor, hailed by Toscanini as is heir, and the new director of La Scala, died in an airplane crash in France. Toscanini, who was in failing health and died less than two months later, was not informed of the death of his protégée. Cantelli was but 36 years old at the time of his death. He left his wife, and their 5-month-old son.

In 1961, five years after the tragedy, the Cantelli Awards were established in Novara, to be hosted at the Teatro Coccia. The late Italian maestro was originally from Novara, and it was in this Piedmontese city that he conducted his last concert.

The last edition of the awards, in which the Cantelli Prize was won by Donato Renzetti, was held in 1980. In the 2020s, in occasion of the anniversary of the maestro's 100th birthday, the Cantelli Awards were revived in Novara.

== 2020 revival ==
The 2020 Cantelli Prize was won by New Zealand's Tianyi Lu, who also won the Teatro Regio of Torino Orchestra Award and the Youth Award. In the 2020 edition, the Critics Award was won by Dmitry Matvienko, who was also the winner of the Made in Italy Award. The Town's Award was won by Diego Ceretta.

== Winners ==
The following is a list of winners of the Premio Cantelli (the First Prize of the Awards) since its inception in October 1961.

Edition	Year	Award	Winner	Orchestra
1	1961	I winner	Hermann Michael	I Pomeriggi musicali
2	1963	I winner	Eliahu Inbal	Orchestra del Teatro alla Scala
3	1965	I winner	Walter Gilessen	Orchestra del Teatro alla Scala
4	1967	I winner	Riccardo Muti	Orchestra del Teatro alla Scala
5	1969	I winner	James Frazier	Orchestra del Teatro alla Scala
6	1971	I winner	Inoue Michiyoshi	Orchestra del Teatro alla Scala
7	1973	II winners (ex aequo)	Ádám Fischer, Lothar Zagrosek	Orchestra del Teatro alla Scala
8	1975	I winner	Hubert Soudant	Orchestra del Teatro alla Scala
9	1977	I winner	Wojciech Michniewski	Orchestra del Teatro alla Scala
10	1980	I winner	Donato Renzetti	Orchestra del Teatro alla Scala
11	2020	I winner	Tianyi Lu	Orchestra del Teatro alla Scala
12	2022	I winner	No first prize awarded	Orchestra Teatro Regio Torino
13	2024	I winner	Min Gyu Song	Milan Symphony Orchestra
14	2026	I winner	Feifan Jiang	Milan Symphony Orchestra
