= The Phoenix Symphony =

Orchestra in Phoenix, Arizona

- Orchestra
- Short name: TPS
- Founded: 1947
- Location: Phoenix, Arizona, U.S.
- Concert hall: Phoenix Symphony Hall
- Music director: Paolo Bortolameolli
- Website: www.phoenixsymphony.org

The Phoenix Symphony is an American symphony orchestra based in Phoenix, Arizona. With a season that "runs from October to May", it performs primarily at Phoenix Symphony Hall, and is the only full-time professional orchestra in the state of Arizona.

== History ==
Founded in 1947, the orchestra began as an occasional group of amateur musicians performing four concerts each year, with John Manley Barnett as its first music director, from 1947 to 1948. In subsequent years, music faculty from Arizona State University joined the ensemble, which attained part-time status. During the music directorship of Theo Alcántara, from 1978 to 1988, the orchestra achieved full-time status in 1983.

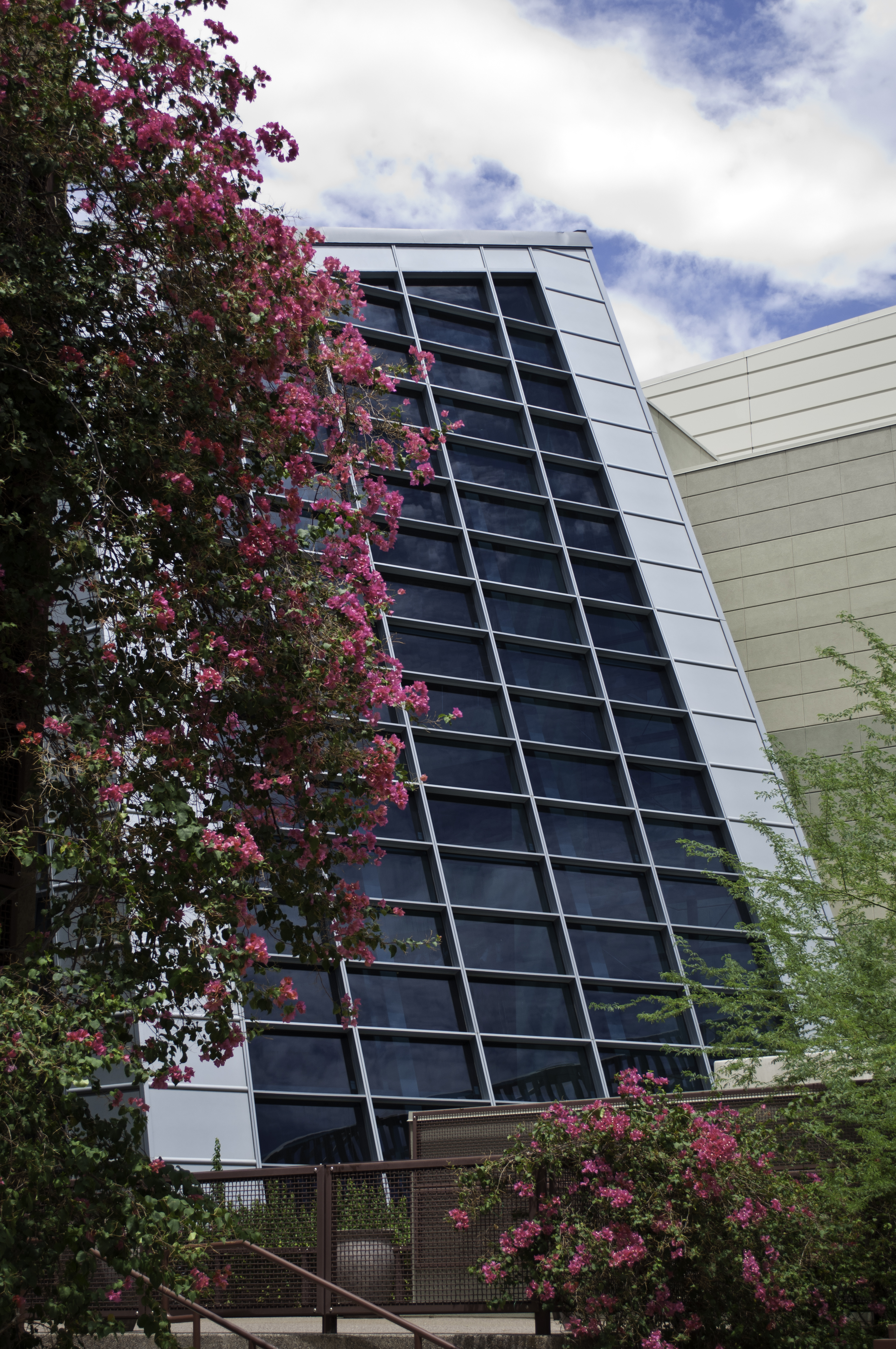
Phoenix Symphony Hall, Copper Square, Phoenix, Arizona, in 2011

During the music directorship of James Sedares, from 1989 to 1995, the orchestra recorded commercially for KOCH International Classics. Hermann Michael was principal guest conductor and artistic adviser of the orchestra for two seasons, and then its music director from 1997 to 2004.

Michael Christie was music director of the orchestra from 2005 to 2013. In 2011, Jim Ward became president and chief executive officer of the orchestra, and negotiated financial restructuring to address fiscal deficits and financial challenges. With Christie, the orchestra recorded commercially for Naxos Records. Christie was subsequently music director laureate of the orchestra from 2013 to 2016.

In February 2014, the orchestra named Tito Muñoz as its 11th music director, after two guest-conducting appearances by Muñoz with the orchestra.

In January 2020, the orchestra announced the appointment of Suzanne Wilson as its next president and chief executive officer, effective 21 January 2020, in succession to Ward following his retirement from the post. In March 2020, in the wake of the COVID-19 pandemic and resulting concert cancellations, the orchestra furloughed its musicians for the remainder of the 2019–2020 season, along with reductions in its administrative and artistic personnel, and salary reductions for remaining staff. In August 2020, the orchestra announced the cancellation of its 2020–2021 concert season, the first U.S. orchestra to cancel its planned 2020–2021 season in its entirety, again in the wake of the COVID-19 pandemic. The orchestra resumed performing for the 2021–2022 season.

Wilson stood down as the orchestra's president and chief executive officer in 2022. In January 2023, the orchestra announced the appointment of Peter Kjome as its next president and chief executive officer, effective 1 February 2023. Muñoz concluded his tenure as its music director at the close of the 2023–2024 season, and subsequently took the title of artistic partner for two seasons.

In October 2024, Paolo Bortolameolli first guest-conducted the orchestra. He returned to conduct the orchestra's opening concert of its 2025–2026 season. In March 2026, the orchestra announced the appointment of Bortolameolli as its next music director, effective with the 2027–2028 season. Bortolameolli is scheduled to take the title of music director-designate for the 2026–2027 season.

2026-2027 Season Suspension

On October 20, 2026 the Phoenix Symphony announced that it was suspending its 2026-2027 season, effective November 2, 2026 because of financial struggles. The symphony's board of directors canceled the season just weeks after its October 9th season opener, because it did not have the financial resources necessary to continue the season. The symphony board's "objective" was to return the orchestra to performing once it has addressed its financial problems. One week before suspending its season, the symphony had to cancel a hip-hop concert "due to unforeseen circumstances." The orchestra has a history of financial troubles; it announced it needed about $10m in operating funds to restart the season. A $6.5 million donation to the symphony was stalled in court after trustees complained the symphony did not disclose its pending season suspension During the summer of 2026 leading up to the suspension, the symphony asked the City of Phoenix to waive $533,500 of unpaid facility fees and rent for Symphony Hall. This included amounts due to private vendors for security and event staff services. On November, 6, 2026, four days after the season suspension had begun -- and after a "concentrated fundraising effort" -- the symphony announced that the 2026-2027 season suspension would be lifted on November 12, 2026 through, at least, December 31, 2026.

== Music directors ==
- John Barnett (1947–1948)
- Robert Lawrence (1949–1951)
- Leslie Hodge (1952–1958)
- Guy Taylor (1959–1968)
- Philip Spurgeon (1969–1971)
- Eduardo Mata (1972–1978)
- Theo Alcántara (1978–1988)
- James Sedares (1989–1995)
- Hermann Michael (1997–2004)
- Michael Christie (2005–2013)
- Tito Muñoz (2014–2024)
- Paolo Bortolameolli (designate, effective autumn 2027)
