= Michiyoshi Inoue =

Japanese conductor (born 1946)

Michiyoshi Inoue (井上道義, Inoue Michiyoshi) (born on December 23, 1946) is a Japanese conductor. He is a recipient of the Cantelli Award.

== Biography ==
Michiyoshi Inoue was born on December 23, 1946, in Tokyo, Japan.

In 1971 he was awarded the Cantelli Award for young conductors at the Teatro Coccia in Novara, Italy, debuting at La Scala the same year.

Between 1977 and 1981, he was the principal guest conductor of the New Zealand Symphony Orchestra. Upon returning to Japan he was the director of the New Japan Philharmonic Orchestra in Tokyo from 1983 and 1988. In 1989 he then became the music director of the Kyoto Symphony Orchestra, a position he held until 1998. He rejoined the New Japan Philharmonic Orchestra as first guest conductor in 2000.

From 2007 to 2018 he was the director of the Kanazawa Orchestra. From 2014 to 2017 he directed the Osaka Philharmonic Orchestra.

On 18 March 2013, he conducted the State Symphony Orchestra of the DPRK in Pyongyang.
