= Walter Gillessen =

German conductor

Walter Gillessen (born on December 1, 1941) is a German conductor.

Gillessen was born in Cologne He is the son of German conductor Franz Gillessen. He attended Cologne's gymnasium and the Musikschule Köln. In October 1965 he won the Cantelli Prize for young conductors at the Teatro Coccia of Novara, Italy.

He was the principal guest conductor of the KPO for two years in the 1980s.
