= Tianyi Lu =

Chinese-born New Zealand orchestral conductor

- Born: 1989 or 1990 (age 35–36); Shanghai, China
- Genre: Classical
- Occupation: Conductor

Tianyi Lu (born 1989/1990) is a Chinese-born New Zealand conductor based in Europe.

== Early life and education ==
Born in Shanghai, China, Lu emigrated to Auckland, New Zealand with her parents when she was five. She studied the piano and flute and sang in various choirs throughout her youth. During her principal studies in flute and composition at the University of Auckland, she also began studying conducting with Karen Grylls and Uwe Grodd, as well as with Eckehard Stier, the then music director of the Auckland Philharmonia Orchestra. She graduated from the University of Auckland with First Class Honours and was granted various awards and scholarships to study a Master of Music in Conducting with John Hopkins at the University of Melbourne, Australia.

In 2012 and 2013, Lu was an active participant in the Symphony Services International Conducting Training Programme, which saw her take masterclasses with the Auckland Philharmonia Orchestra and Tasmanian Symphony Orchestra with teachers such as Christopher Seaman and Marko Letonja.

In 2015, Lu completed a Master of Music in Orchestral Conducting with Distinction with David Jones at the Royal Welsh College of Music and Drama. She also attended several masterclasses in Europe.

== Career ==
=== Positions ===
Tianyi Lu became the Principal Conductor of the St Woolos Sinfonia in Wales in 2014.

Lu was also a Dudamel Fellow with the Los Angeles Philharmonic for the 2017/2018 season.

Throughout 2017 to 2019, Lu was the Assistant Conductor for the Melbourne Symphony Orchestra.

In 2019, Lu became the first Female Conductor in Residence for the Welsh National Opera.

In 2021, Lu was also announced as the Conductor in Residence with the Stavanger Symphony Orchestra.

Lu was appointed as a board member of the Royal Welsh College of Music and Drama in 2023.

=== Guest conducting ===
Orchestras Tianyi Lu has guest-conducted include the Hallé Orchestra, Romanian Radio National Orchestra, the Madrid Symphony, Gulbenkian Orchestra and Royal Scottish National Orchestra as well as the Turku Philharmonic, and Lapland Chamber Orchestra.

Lu has also guest-conducted the Seattle Symphony, Pacific Symphony, Singapore Symphony and Sydney Symphony Orchestras, as well as the Auckland Philharmonia, Dunedin and Christchurch Symphony Orchestras.

In August 2024, Lu made her BBC Proms debut conducting the BBC Symphony Orchestra. The programme included the UK Premiere of Francisco Coll’s Cello Concerto, played by Sol Gabetta.

=== Awards ===
In 2020, Lu won first prize at both the International Conducting Competition "Guido Cantelli" in Italy, and the Sir Georg Solti International Conductors' Competition in Germany.

== Other ==
Tianyi Lu featured in the fifth episode of the documentary series Empowered by Christina Rose and MirrorWater Entertainment. The episode, titled A Woman's New World, was filmed in early 2020 and released at the end of 2021. This highlighted her ethos of empowerment, using music to create compassionate connections across diverse communities.
