= Francisco Coll García =

Spanish composer (born 1985)

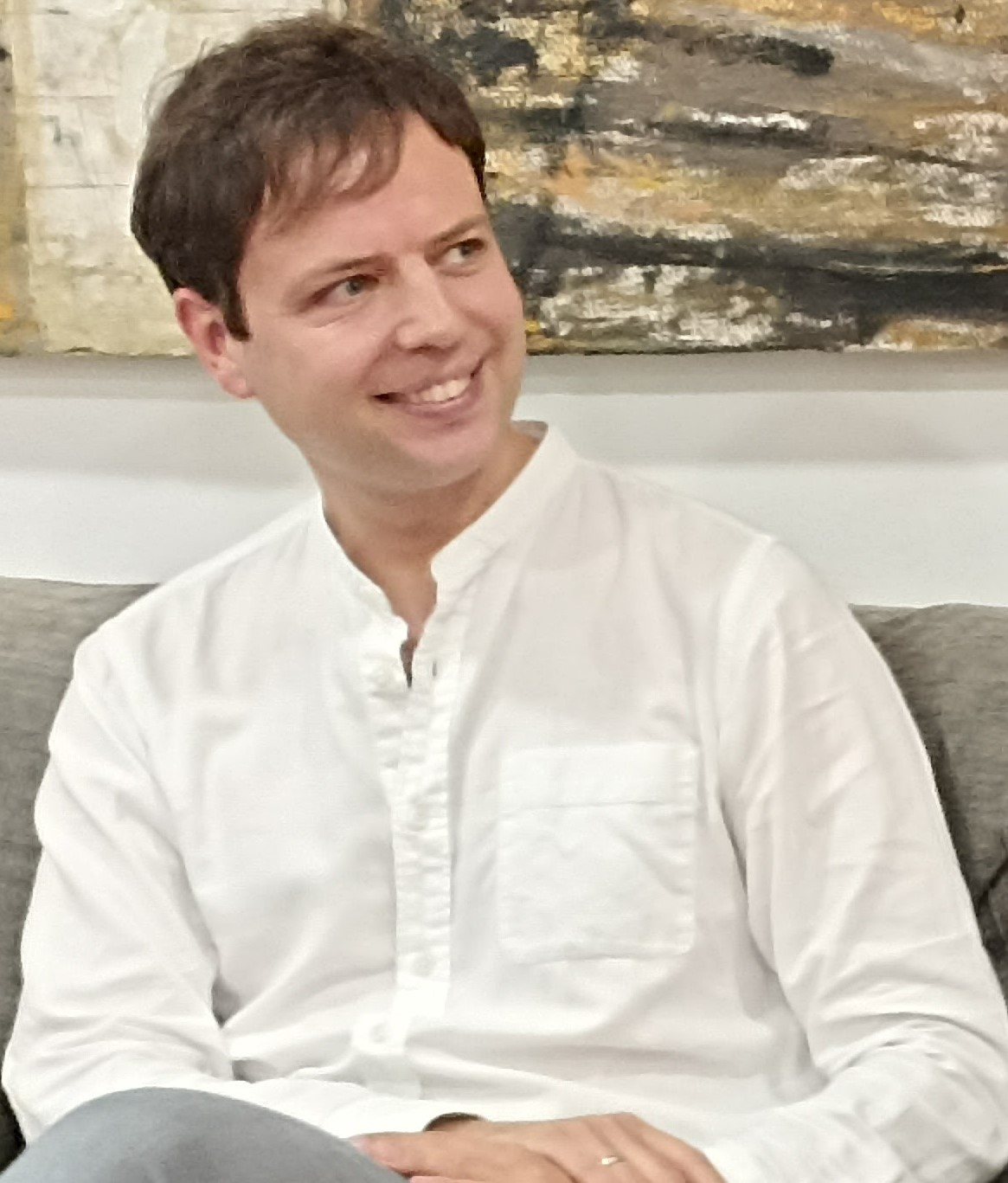
Francisco Coll

Francisco Coll (born in 1985 in Valencia) is a Spanish composer.

== Biography ==
Francisco Coll studied trombone at the Joaquín Rodrigo Conservatoire of Music in Valencia and the Madrid Royal Conservatory, graduating with the Honour Prize. He studied composition at the Guildhall School of Music and Drama with Richard Baker with the support of the Instituto Valenciano de la Música (IVM) Scholarship and the Guildhall Trust, and privately with Thomas Adès. He completed a master's degree in composition with distinction in 2010, winning the Ian Horsburgh Memorial Prize for the best postgraduate composition, and currently is a Fellow at Guildhall.

His first commission, "...Whose name I don't want to remember" (2005) for double brass quintet, was premiered in Avery Fisher Hall of the Lincoln Center of New York, by Canadian Brass and the brass section of the New York Philharmonic Orchestra. He won the Montserrat 2006 International Week of Chamber Music Prize with El juego lúgubre for two pianos and in the following year the National Award "Valencia Crea" with La Ciudad Paranoica for ensemble of 10 players. He won the Sociedad General de Autores y Editores (SGAE)'s 2008 "Carmelo A. Bernaola" Prize for Cuando el niño era niño... for piano quartet. Aqua Cinereus (2006) for large orchestra was premiered on the "Palau de la Musica", by the Philharmonic Orchestra of the University of Valencia conducted by Cristóbal Soler. Óxido (2010) for soprano and ensemble was premiered at Wigmore Hall, London under the baton of the composer. Hidd'n Blue (2009) for the London Symphony Orchestra was workshopped and recorded on 5 October 2009 as part of the LSO Discovery Panufnik Young Composers Scheme. Coll was chosen to represent Spain at the International Rostrum of Composers/UNESCO (Lisbon, 2010). He took a Composition Residency during the Aldeburgh Festival 2010. Later projects include a commission from Los Angeles Philharmonic to be premiered at the Walt Disney Concert Hall in 2011, an octet for members of the BBC Symphony Orchestra for broadcast on BBC Radio 3, and another commission from the 2011 Aldeburgh Festival for the Barbirolli Quartet which will subsequently tour to the Verbier Festival, Switzerland. He is Composer in Association with the Valencia Youth Orchestra (JOGV). Coll's music is published by Faber Music.

In August 2024, at the BBC Proms, his Cello Concerto was given its UK Premiere by Sol Gabetta and the BBC Symphony Orchestra, conducted by Tianyi Lu.

As trombonist he has collaborated with the Mediterraneo Symphony Orchestra, Filarmonía Orchestra, Grupo instrumental of Madrid, Torrent's City Symphony Orchestra and others. And he was a member of the JOGV, and the University of Valencia Philharmonic Orchestra. In 2005 he won the "Vicent Galbis" Interpretation Prize, and in 2007 the "Villa Castellnovo" Prize for young performers. He subsequently studied trombone at the Guildhall School of Music & Drama with John Kenny.

== Works ==
- Aforismos (2003) for solo piano.
- ...Whose name I don't want to remember (2005) for double brass quintet.
- El Juego Lugubre (2006) for 2 pianos.
- Op.1 Aqua Cinereus (2006) for large orchestra.
- Op.2 La Ciudad Paranoica (2007) for ensemble of 10 players.
- Op.3 Cuando el niño era niño... (2008) for piano quartet.
- Op.4 Tapias (2008–2012) for trombone and orchestra, commissioned by the Festival de Música de Alicante for the Orquesta Nacional de España.
- Op.5 Shadow song (2008–09) for voices and small ensemble.
- Op.6 Hidd'n Blue (2009) for large orchestra, commissioned by the London Symphony Orchestra, was given its first performance at the Barbican Hall under the direction of Thomas Adès.
- Op.7 Piedras SKTCH (2009) for ensemble of 8 players.
- Op.8 Capricho (2009) for cello and piano.
- Op.9 Óxido (2010) for soprano and ensemble.
- Op.10 ...de voz aceitunada (2010) for flute, viola and harp, commissioned by Richmond Concert Society.
- Op.11 Piedras (2010) for chamber orchestra, commissioned by Los Angeles Philharmonic in 2011.
- Op.12 Zortziko(2010) for octet.
- Op.13 Ich Selbst.. (2010–11) for two trombones and two percussion players, commissioned by the IVM.
- Op.14 Sguardo verso l'interno (2011) for string quartet and clarinet, co-commissioned by the Aix-en-Provence, Aldeburgh and Verbier festivals.
- Op.15 No seré yo quien diga nada (2011) for piano and orchestra, commissioned by the IVM and premiered at Auditoro de Torrevieja, Spain by Nicolas Hodges and Valencia Youth Orchestra under the baton of Manuel Galduf.
- Op.16 In Extremis (2011) for chorus and orchestra, commissioned by the IVM. The first performance was at Teatre Romá, Sagunto, Spain by JOGV and Manuel Galduf.
- Op.17 Aurum (2011–12) for brass quintet, commissioned by the City of London Festival, was first performed at Goldsmiths' Hall, London by the LSO Brass Players in 2012.
- Op.18 Vestiges (2012) for piano solo.
- Op.19 Ad Marginem (2012) for viola and ensemble, commissioned by the London Sinfonietta.
- Op.20 Four Iberian Miniatures (2013) for violin and piano, commissioned by the Borletti-Buitoni Trust for Byol Kang and Boris Kusnezow and first performed at Festspiele Mecklenburg Vorpommern.
  - version for violin and chamber orchestra (2014), commissioned by Saffron Hall and the Britten Sinfonia
  - version for piano quintet (2015), commissioned by the Fundación Federico García Lorca
- Op.21 Liquid Symmetries (2013) for chamber orchestra, commissioned by the Centro Nacional de Difusión Musical (CNDM), Madrid.
- Op.22 Café Kafka (2013) an opera in one act, commissioned by Aldeburgh Music, Opera North and Royal Opera House Covent Garden with the support from Arts Council England's "Britten Centenary Fund".
- Hyperludes (2014) for solo violin, commissioned by Manuel Tomás and the London Sinfonietta.
- Overture after in Extremis (2014) for large orchestra.
- Mural (2013–2015) for large orchestra, commissioned by Orchestre Philharmonique du Luxembourg & Philharmonie Luxembourg, the National Youth Orchestra of Great Britain and Palau de les Arts Reina Sofía (Valencia)

== Prizes ==
- "Hui, Hui música, Premio Arts XXI (2005) for Aforismos
- "Vicent Galbis" Prize (Valencia, 2005).
- SIMC Prize (Montserrat, 2006) for El Juego Lúgubre
- National Prize "Valencia Crea" (2007) for La Ciudad Paranoica
- "Villa Castellnovo" Prize. (2007)
- "Carmelo A. Bernaola" Composition Prize SGAE (2008) for Cuando el niño era niño...
- "Mary Ryan" Composition Award (London, 2009)
- "Ian Horsburgh Memorial Prize" (London, 2010)
- "ICMA" Composer Award (2019)
- "ICMA" Orchestra Award (2022)
- "ICMA" Contemporary Recording Award (2022) for Orchestral Works (Pentatone PTC 5186951)
