= Hermann Michael =

German conductor (1937–2005)

- Born: 1937; Schwäbisch Gmünd, Baden-Württemberg, Germany
- Died: September 1, 2005 (aged 67–68); Uffing am Staffelsee, Bavaria, Germany
- Occupation: Conductor

Hermann Michael (1937–2005) was a German symphonic and opera conductor. He studied piano and cello at the Stuttgart Conservatory and had not formally studied conducting when he audited a master class led by Herbert von Karajan in Berlin in 1960. Michael then took a three-week master class with conductor Hans Swarowsky and was invited to the first Cantelli Conducting Competition in Italy, which he won.

Michael served as von Karajan's assistant at the Vienna State Opera and undertook guest engagements before being appointed director of the Bremen Opera, where he served from 1970 to 1978. After 1984 he was active in North America, conducting the symphony orchestras in Atlanta, Boston, Chicago, Cincinnati, Detroit, Los Angeles, Minnesota, Montreal, Philadelphia, St. Louis, San Francisco, Seattle, Toronto, and Washington D.C. He also conducted at the Metropolitan Opera from 1989 to 1996, where he led performances of Die Fledermaus, Der Fliegende Holländer, and Fidelio.

According to the obituary in The New York Times, "Mr. Michael had a special relationship with Seattle, where he appeared nearly every season as a guest with the opera company after making his American debut there in 1984. He led three complete "Ring" cycles in Seattle, and regularly performed with the symphony."

He was the music director of the Phoenix [Arizona] Symphony from 1997 to 2004.
