= Donato Renzetti =

Italian conductor

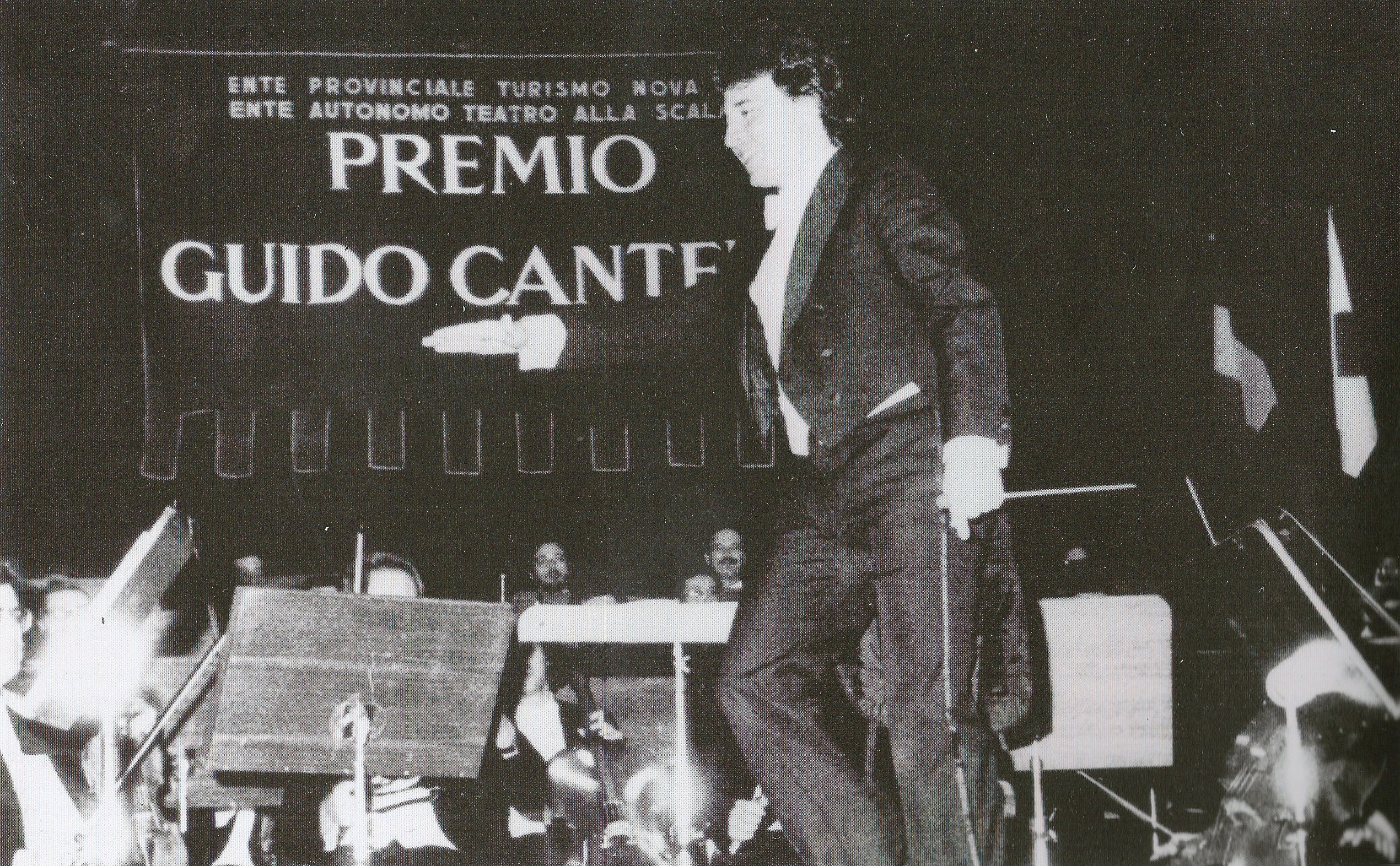
Renzetti receiving the Cantelli Award in 1980

Donato Renzetti (born 30 January 1950) is an Italian conductor. He is the recipient of the 1980 Guido Cantelli Award.

== Biography ==
Renzetti was once a percussionist at Milan's La Scala. He left it to return as a conductor and winner of the Cantelli Award while still a young man.

He conducted "many of the most esteemed orchestras," including the English Chamber Orchestra, London Sinfonietta, London Philharmonic, Philharmonia Orchestra, DSO Berlin, Tokyo Philharmonic, and led operas in such renowned opera houses as the Dallas Opera, Grand Théâtre de Genève, Opéra de Paris, Bayerische Staatsoper and Covent Garden. He made his first appearance at Glyndebourne with Rossini's La Cenerentola, which was acclaimed.

He has conducted some of the most important orchestras in the international music scene: the London Sinfonietta, the London Philharmonic, the London Philharmonic Orchestra, the English Chamber Orchestra, the RIAS in Berlin, the Hungarian State Orchestra, the Tokyo Philharmonic Orchestra, the Buenos Aires Philharmonic, the Orchestra of the Teatro alla Scala in Milan, the Orchestra of the Accademia Nazionale di Santa Cecilia in Rome, the Dallas Symphony, the BRT of Brussels, the Orchestre National du Capitole de Toulouse, the Orchestre National de Lille and the Orchestre National de Lyon, the New Zealand Symphony, the RAI National Symphony Orchestra of Milan, Turin, Rome and the Orchestra Scarlatti of Naples, and the Bilbao Symphony Orchestra.

He has been invited to the world's leading opera houses:Paris Opera for Jérusalem with Veriano Luchetti, Silvano Carroli and Gasdia in 1984,Royal Opera House, London's Covent Garden with L'Italiana in Algeri with Horne in 1989, Grand Theatre de Geneva for Les vêpres siciliennes with Giuliano Ciannella and Robert Lloyd (bass) in 1985, Staatsoper in Munich, Capitol de Toulouse,Carnegie Hall and Metropolitan Opera in New York, Lyric Opera in Chicago, Dallas Opera, San Francisco Opera, Teatro Colón in Buenos Aires, Teatro Bunka in Tokyo, Teatro Megaron in Athens,La Scala in Milan, and all major Italian theaters; he has been a guest in the Glyndebourne, Spoleto and Pesaro Festivals and at the Verdi Festival in Parma.

He has recorded for Philips, Frequenz, Fonit Cetra, Nuova Era and Dynamic CDs with music by Mozart, Tchaikovsky, Simone Mayr and rare and unpublished Overture by Schubert and Cherubini; in the opera field Attila, Il Signor Bruschino, La Cambiale di Matrimonio, La Favorite; DVD of the operas Fille du Regiment at La Scala in Milan, La Cenerentola at the Glyndebourne Festival Opera, La Gioconda at the Arena di Verona, L'Italiana in Algeri at the Pesaro Festival. Schumann's Manfred, recorded with the Orchestra and Chorus of Teatro alla Scala, won the "XIX Premio della Critica Discografica Italiana" award.

Since 1987, he has been a professor of conducting for the Three-Year Advanced Course at the Accademia Musicale Pescarese, discovering talents of new generations including:Massimo Zanetti, Gianandrea Noseda, Daniele Agiman, Pietro Mianiti,Stefano Miceli, Michele Mariotti, Dario Lucantoni, Andrea Di Mele, Massimiliano Caldi, Antonino Manuli, Alessandro Bonato.

In 2002, the College of Accountants of Lanciano in Abruzzo awarded him the "Premio Frentano d'Oro" for his artistic merits in Italy and abroad. The Associazione Amici della Lirica of the Pesaro Opera Festival honored him with the award of the "Premio Rossini d'Oro 2006." In 2009, the XXVI "Luigi Illica Prize" and the "Carloni" Prize of the Barattelli of L'Aquila. In 2022 he was appointed music director of the Macerata Opera Festival succeeding Francesco Lanzillotta.
