= Riccardo Muti =

Italian conductor (born 1941)

Riccardo Muti OMRI GCSG
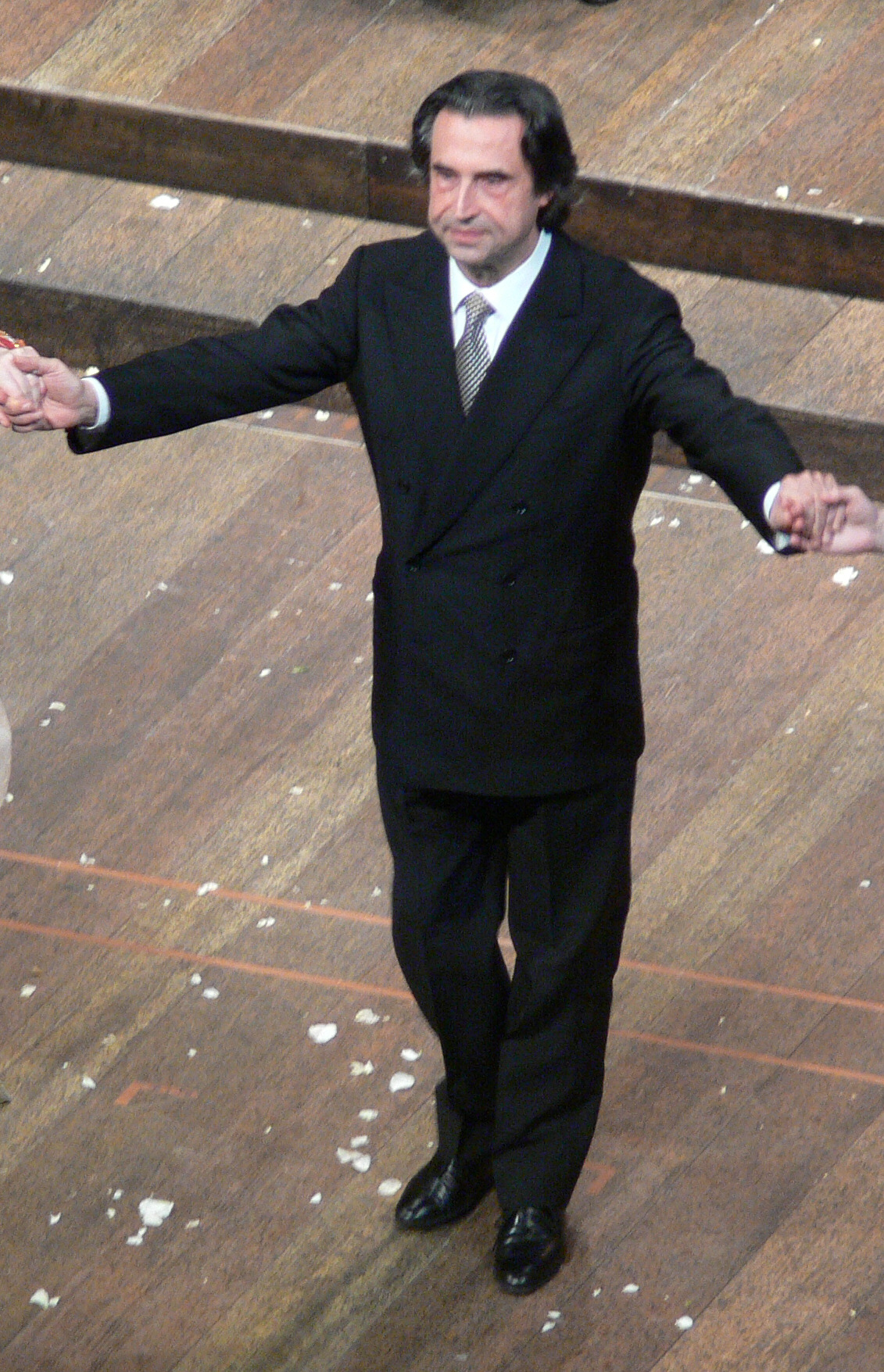
- Muti in 2008
- Born: 28 July 1941 (age 85); Naples, Kingdom of Italy
- Education: Conservatory of San Pietro a Majella, Naples; Giuseppe Verdi Conservatory, Milan
- Occupation: Conductor
- Years active: 1963–present
- Spouse: Cristina Mazzavillani (m. 1969)
- Children: 3
- Website: riccardomuti.com

Riccardo Muti (Italian: [rikˈkardo ˈmuːti]; born 28 July 1941) is an Italian conductor. He is the current music director of the Orchestra Giovanile Luigi Cherubini. Muti has previously held posts at the Maggio Musicale in Florence, the Philharmonia Orchestra in London, the Philadelphia Orchestra, the Teatro alla Scala in Milan, the Salzburg Whitsun Festival, and the Chicago Symphony Orchestra. He was named music director emeritus in Chicago in 2023.

A prolific recording artist, Muti has received numerous honours and awards, including two Grammy Awards. He is especially associated with the music of Giuseppe Verdi. Among the world's leading conductors, in a 2015 Bachtrack poll he was ranked by music critics as the world's fifth best living conductor.

== Childhood and education ==
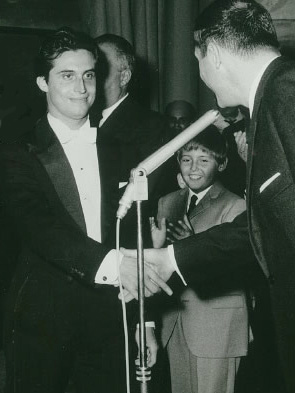
Riccardo Muti, Premio Cantelli Teatro Coccia di Novara, 1967

Muti was born in Naples but he spent his early childhood in Molfetta, near Bari, in the region of Apulia on Italy's southern Adriatic coast. His father, Domenico, was a pathologist in Molfetta, as well as an amateur singer and great music lover; his mother, Gilda, was a reserved and severe Neapolitan woman with five children.

Muti graduated from Liceo classico (Classical Lyceum) Vittorio Emanuele II in Naples, then studied piano at the Conservatory of San Pietro a Majella under Vincenzo Vitale; here Muti was awarded a diploma cum laude. He was subsequently awarded a diploma in Composition and Conducting by the Giuseppe Verdi Conservatory, Milan, where he studied with the composer Bruno Bettinelli and the conductor Antonino Votto. He has also studied composition with Nino Rota, whom he considers a mentor. He was unanimously awarded first place by the jury of the "Guido Cantelli Competition for Conductors" in Milan in 1967 and became, the next year, principal conductor and music director of the Maggio Musicale Fiorentino, a post he held for eleven years.

== Career ==
=== Early career ===
Since 1971, he has been a frequent conductor of operas and concerts at the Salzburg Festival, where he is particularly known for his Mozart opera performances. From 1972 Muti regularly conducted the Philharmonia Orchestra in London and in 1973 he was appointed its principal conductor, succeeding Otto Klemperer.

In 1979, Muti became the music director and principal conductor of the Philadelphia Orchestra. In 1986, he became principal conductor of the Filarmonica della Scala, Milan, with which in 1988, he received the Viotti d'Oro and toured Europe. In 1989, he conducted a live performance of Mozart's Don Giovanni that was recorded on a DVD. In 1991, after twelve years as music director, he announced his resignation from the Philadelphia Orchestra, effective at the end of the 1991–1992 season.

In 1995, he was the president of the jury of the International Composing Competition "2 Agosto".

=== Berlin and Vienna ===
Muti has been a regular guest of the Berlin Philharmonic and the Vienna Philharmonic. In 1996, he conducted the Vienna Philharmonic during Vienna Festival Week and on tour to Japan, Korea, Hong Kong and Germany; he most recently toured with the Vienna Philharmonic to Japan in 2008. Muti has also led the orchestra's Vienna New Year's Concert on seven occasions to date: in 1993, 1997, 2000, 2004, 2018, 2021 and 2025.

=== Work in opera ===
Apart from his work at Milan's Teatro alla Scala, where he was music director for 19 years, Muti has led operatic performances with the Philadelphia Orchestra and productions in the principal opera houses of Rome (from 1969), Ravenna, Vienna, London (from 1977), Munich (from 1979), and, finally, in 2010, New York. His work with the Vienna State Opera has included Aida in 1973, La forza del destino in 1974, Norma in 1977, Rigoletto in 1983, Così fan tutte in 1996 and 2008, Don Giovanni in 1999, and The Marriage of Figaro in 2001.

=== Appearances in Salzburg ===
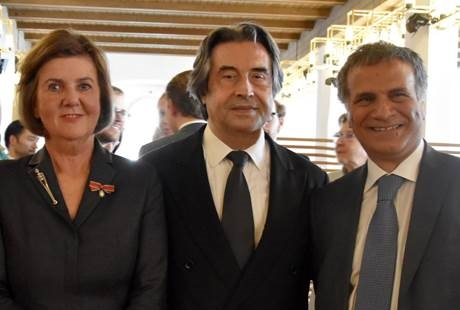
Salzburg Festival President Helga Rabl-Stadler with Riccardo Muti, 14 August 2016

Muti first conducted at the Salzburg Festival in 1971 with Donizetti's Don Pasquale (staged by Ladislav Stros). Muti has subsequently appeared regularly at the Salzburg Festival, conducting numerous concerts with the Vienna Philharmonic. After the death of Herbert von Karajan in 1989, he took over the concert Karajan used to give with the Vienna Philharmonic on the Feast of the Assumption of Mary (15 August), a public holiday in Austria, and was considered by some as his potential successor, although he never assumed any official position.

Opera productions Muti conducted in Salzburg included Così fan tutte (staged by Michael Hampe) from 1982 to 1985 and from 1990 to 1991, La clemenza di Tito (staged by Peter Brenner) in 1988 and 1989, Don Giovanni (staged by Michael Hampe) in 1990 and 1991, La traviata (staged by Lluis Pasqual, and designed by Luciano Damiani) in 1995, Die Zauberflöte in 2005 (staged by Graham Vick) and 2006 (staged by Pierre Audi, stage designed by Karel Appel), Otello (staged by Stephen Langridge) in 2008, Moise et Pharaon (staged by Jürgen Flimm) in 2009, and Orfeo ed Euridice (staged by Dieter Dorn) in 2010. In 2011, he conducted a new production of Verdi's Macbeth, which was directed by Peter Stein. For the 2017 Salzburg Festival, he conducted Aida, directed by Shirin Neshat. Muti also owns a residence close to Salzburg.

From 2007 to 2011, Muti was the artistic director of the Salzburg Whitsun Festival. He conducted productions of rare Italian operas from the 18th century Neapolitan School as well as concerts, with the Luigi Cherubini Youth Orchestra, which he had founded.

=== Later European career ===
In July 2015, the first edition of the Riccardo Muti Italian Opera Academy at the Teatro Alighieri in Ravenna took place, for the training of young conductors, répétiteurs and singers. In June 2026, the Orchestre National de France announced the appointment of Muti, who had first guest-conducted the ONF in March 1980, as its new chef émérite (conductor emeritus), with immediate effect.

=== In the United States ===
==== Philadelphia and New York ====
In the United States, from 1980 to 1992 Muti was music director of the Philadelphia Orchestra, which he led on numerous international tours. In 1979, he was appointed its music director and, in 1992, conductor laureate. Muti stated that his approach was to remain faithful to the intent of the composer. This meant a change from applying the lush "Philadelphia Sound," created by his predecessors Eugene Ormandy and Leopold Stokowski, to all repertoire; however, many of his recordings with that orchestra largely seem to do away with its hallmark sound, even in the works of such composers as Tchaikovsky, Brahms, and other high romantics. His sonic changes to the orchestra remain controversial. Some felt he turned it into a generic-sounding institution with a lean sound much favoured by modern recording engineers. Others believe Muti uncovered the true intention of the works, which had been covered in a silky sheen by Muti's predecessor. Since his departure from Philadelphia, he has made very few guest conducting appearances with the Philadelphia Orchestra, once in 2005, and most recently in 2024 conducting Verdi's Requiem.

Muti had been a regular and popular guest conductor with the New York Philharmonic. The orchestra's musicians had reportedly been interested – towards the end of the tenures of Kurt Masur and Lorin Maazel, and before Muti took the Chicago post – in having the conductor as their music director, but Muti stated that he had no wish to take on the position.

==== Chicago ====
Muti had first guest-conducted the Chicago Symphony Orchestra (CSO) in 1973 at the Ravinia Festival but did not return as a guest conductor with the CSO until 2007. Deborah Rutter, then president of the CSO saw him in Paris and persuaded him to come guest conduct and tour; he explained later, he thought he was too tired to start a "new adventure", but "immediately it was something that happened between me and the orchestra."

In May 2008, the CSO named Muti its next music director, effective with the 2010–2011 season, with an initial contract of five years. His most recent contract extension, announced in January 2018, is through the 2021–2022 season. In January 2020, the CSO confirmed that Muti is to conclude his music directorship of the orchestra at the close of the 2021–2022 season. In September 2021, the CSO announced a revision to Muti's contract as its music director, with an extension of the scheduled closing date of his tenure to the end of the 2022–2023 season. Muti announced that he will step down as music director of the Chicago Symphony Orchestra at the end of the 2022–2023 season. According to classical music critic Zachary Wolfe, his directorship in Chicago was an "enormous success" with "pristine yet intense, powerful yet graceful" performances of operas in concert, canonical orchestral pieces, new premiers, and "rarities of the past". In June 2023, it was announced that beginning in the 2024–2025 season Muti would be named Music Director Emeritus for life, and continue occasional performances.

=== End of tenure in Milan ===
In 2003, there were reports of artistic and programming conflicts at La Scala between musical director and principal conductor Muti and general manager Carlo Fontana. Muti did not attend the press conference that announced the 2003–04 season. The appointment in 2003 of Mauro Meli as La Scala's artistic director was intended to calm the conflict between Fontana and Muti.

On 24 February 2005, La Scala governors dismissed Fontana as general manager and named Meli as his successor. The musicians sided with Fontana against Muti at this point in the dispute, and on 13 March, Muti stated that he would refuse to conduct the La Scala orchestra from that point on. On 16 March 2005, the orchestra and staff of La Scala voted overwhelmingly against Muti in a motion of no-confidence. Muti was forced to cancel a concert prior to the vote, and some other productions were disrupted at the theatre because of continuing rifts with Fontana's supporters. On 2 April, he resigned from La Scala, citing "hostility" from staff members.

In August 2009, Muti was said to be named the next music director of the Teatro dell'Opera di Roma, effective December 2010, but the news given by the mayor (and therefore president of Opera di Roma) Gianni Alemanno was not true. Alemanno, instead, announced in October 2011 that Muti accepted an invitation by the Orchestra of Opera di Roma to become a "lifetime conductor" of Opera di Roma.

=== Political intervention ===
On the night of 12 March 2011, Rome's Teatro dell'Opera staged the first in a series of scheduled performances of Verdi's opera Nabucco, conducted by Muti. After the end of the chorus "Va, pensiero", which contains the lyrics "Oh mia patria, sì bella e perduta" ("Oh my country, so beautiful and so lost"), the audience applauded "heartily." Muti, breaking with opera protocol and the strict conventions of composer Verdi himself, turned to the audience and delivered a small speech, referring to the severe budget cuts announced by the Berlusconi government which would particularly affect the funding of the arts. He spoke of the need to keep culture alive in Italy, prompted, as he later stated, by the belief that "killing culture in a country like Italy is a crime against society. Culture is the spiritual glue that holds a people together." He then invited the audience to participate in an encore of the "Va, pensiero" chorus – the invitation and the encore also a break from tradition for an opera performance. The opera audience stood up and sang along with the on-stage chorus. Muti recalls that "80 percent of the audience knew the lyrics" and sang along, while "some members of the chorus were in tears."

On 18 March, the performance of Nabucco was repeated in front of the former Italian president Giorgio Napolitano and former prime minister Silvio Berlusconi. Muti, who had stated that it had been the first time in his life that he conducted chorus and audience together and also the last, on that occasion conducted the Verdi opera in the "orthodox" manner.

== Personal life ==
Muti is married to Maria Cristina Mazzavillani, the founder and director of the Ravenna Festival. They have two sons, Domenico and Francesco, and a daughter, Chiara, who is married to the pianist David Fray.

In 2010, Muti wrote an autobiography. The following year, it was translated and published in English as Riccardo Muti: An Autobiography: First the Music, Then the Words. Music critic John von Rhein of the Chicago Tribune described Muti's memoir as "fascinating."

== Repertoire and recordings ==
External audio
- Muti conducting Rossini's opera William Tell with La Scala Opera Orchestra and Giorgio Zancanaro, Chris Merritt, Cheryl Studer (1988, 4 hours)

With the Philadelphia Orchestra, his recordings include a Beethoven symphony cycle, the symphonies of Brahms and Scriabin, selected works of Tchaikovsky and Prokofiev, as well as less-known works of composers such as Puccini and Busoni.

Muti is considered one of the world's greatest conductors of the operas of Verdi. He also led a series of annual performances of opera in concerts including the works of Verdi, Puccini, Mozart and Wagner. In 1992, Muti conducted performances of Leoncavallo's Pagliacci with Luciano Pavarotti. A recording was also made of these performances.

At La Scala, Muti was noted for exploring lesser-known works of the Classical- and early Romantic-era repertory such as Lodoiska by Cherubini and La vestale by Spontini.

== Recognition ==
=== Honours ===
- Muti received several honours from the Italian government: in 1980, he was appointed a Grand Officer of the Order of Merit of the Italian Republic and was promoted to a Knight Grand Cross of the same Order in 1990. He was awarded a Golden Medal of the Italian Order of Merit for Culture and Art in 1997.
- Muti is an honorary member of the Royal Academy of Music (Hon RAM) since 1981.
- In 1989, Muti was elected to the American Philosophical Society.
- Honorary degree, University of Pavia, 1996.
- Muti was made an honorary Knight Commander of the Order of the British Empire (KBE) in 2000.
- Muti was awarded a doctorate honoris causa by the Universitat de Barcelona on 13 October 2003.
- In 2008, Muti was elected to the American Academy of Arts and Sciences.
- On 4 June 2010, Muti was appointed a Commander of the Legion of Honour by then French First Lady Carla Bruni-Sarkozy.
- In 2011, Muti was made a Member of Russia's Order of Friendship.
- In 2012, Muti was made Knight Grand Cross of the Order of Saint Gregory the Great by Pope Benedict XVI.
- In 2013, Muti was named Honorary President of EMMA for Peace, a network of music institutions.
- On 20 June 2014, Muti received an honorary degree from Northwestern University in Evanston.
- On 3 July 2016, Muti was awarded the 2nd Class, Gold and Silver Star of Japan's Order of the Rising Sun.
- On 1 July 2018, Muti was awarded the 3rd Class, Order of Merit (Ukraine).

=== Awards ===
- 2010 Grammy Awards (2) for Best Classical Album and Best Choral Performance for Verdi: Requiem
- 2011 Birgit Nilsson Prize
- 2011 Prince of Asturias Award for the Arts
- 2018 Praemium Imperiale
- 2025 Ratzinger Prize

Cultural offices
Preceded by Claudio Abbado	Music director, Teatro alla Scala; 1986–2005	Succeeded by Daniel Barenboim
