= James Frazier (conductor) =

American orchestral conductor (1940–1985)

James Frazier (1940 – March 10, 1985) was an American orchestral conductor. Frazier was awarded the Cantelli Award in 1969. He went on to attain several prestigious engagements in Europe, the United States, and South America. He was one of the most successful African American conductors in the 1970s.

== Biography ==
He was born to a Detroit sanitation worker and at 5 was enrolled in the Detroit Conservatory of Music. By 16, Frazier was conducting from memory in churches, conducting works like Felix Mendelssohn's Elijah and George Frideric Handel's Messiah. He received a degree in chemistry from Wayne State University. During his senior year in college he conducted Elijah with William Warfield as soloist, and was urged to consider a professional career. He attended National Music Camp in Michigan, and eventually was chosen with other three conductors to conduct in public. He then went on to conduct at the Detroit Symphony Orchestra, with encouragement from Eugene Ormandy. He later obtained his master's degree in music from the University of Michigan.

In 1969, he won the Cantelli Award in Italy. This led him to conduct in several prestigious orchestras, including the Saint Petersburg Philharmonic Orchestra and the Belarusian State Philharmonic. Frazier garnered acclaim from the orchestras of Detroit and Minsk.

Frazier composed King Requiem, a Requiem mass for Martin Luther King Jr., and conducted its premiere in Detroit on May 9, 1969, with Warfield as soloist. He also composed a musical, 12th Street: A Soul Opera, telling about life in his Detroit, and created the special "Soul and Symphony", which was broadcast on NBC, in the anthology series Special Treat. In the 1970s, Frazier was teaching in public schools in Long Island City.

By 1975 he had conducted, among others, the Detroit Symphony Orchestra, the Philadelphia Orchestra, London's New Philharmonic Symphony Orchestra, the Spanish Radio and Television Symphony Orchestra, the Belarusian State Philharmonic and the Saint Petersburg Philharmonic Orchestra. Later, he also conducted in South America.

In 1981 he was named conductor of the Bogota Symphony. He died in 1985 at the age of 44, after a year of ill health.
