= Wojciech Michniewski =

Polish composer and conductor (1947–2026)

Wojciech Michniewski (4 April 1947 – 29 January 2026) was a Polish composer and conductor.

== Life and career ==
Michniewski studied with Stanisław Wisłocki as well as Andrzej Dobrowolski at the State Music Academy in Warsaw. From 1973 to 1978 he was the conductor of the Warsaw Philharmonic Orchestra. With Krzysztof Knittel and Elżbieta Sikora he founded the composer group KEW (1973–77). For his piece Whisperetto he received the Premio RAI of the Italian radio and television in 1975. He won the 1977 Cantelli Award and the bronze medal at Ernest Ansermet competition in Geneva the following year.

From 1979 to 1981 Michniewski was artistic director of the Teatr Wielki in Łódź, parallel to that, he was music director of the stage for contemporary music of the Warsaw Chamber Opera until 1983. From 1984 to 1987 he was a permanent guest conductor of the Polska Orkiestra Kameralna and played a key role in its transfer to the Sinfonia Varsovia. From 1987 to 1991 he directed the Filharmonia Poznańska, and thereafter worked as a guest conductor with various orchestras, including the National Philharmonic Orchestra, the Sinfonia Varsovia and the Polish Radio Symphony Orchestra.

He directed the world premieres of the operas Wyrywacz serc by Elżbieta Sikora (1995), The Music Programme by Roxanna Panufnik (2000), and Ignorant i szaleniec by Paweł Mykietyn (2001) at the Teatr Wielki Michniewski. He was awarded the Fryderyk in 1996 for a recording of Witold Lutosławski's works and in 1999 for a gala concert with Rossini's music. For his services to contemporary Polish music, Michniewski received the Prize of the Polish Composers' Union (Związek Kompozytorów Polskich).

Michniewski died in January 2026, at the age of 78.

== Works ==
- Etiuda as percussionist and performer (1972)
- Cadenza for violin solo (1972)
- Trzy pieśni do słów siostry for soprano and piano (1972)
- Intermezzo for soprano and chamber orchestra (1973)
- Szeptet for two sopranos, two mezzo-sopranos, two contralto players and bodybuilder (1973)
- Moje konstrukcje liryczne for instrumental ensemble (1974)
- Małe wariacje na temat Mozarta for clarinet, trombone, cello, piano and electronics (1974)
- Litania for flute, harp and electronics (1974)
- Michniewski / Gounod: Wedding Tango dla Kasi i Koreczka for voices, string quartet and bandoneon (2000)
