= Antonino Palminteri =

Italian conductor and composer (1846–1915)

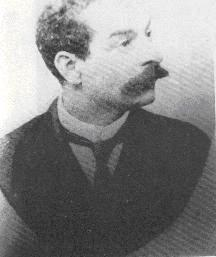
- Born: 3 October 1846; Menfi, Italy
- Died: 31 July 1915 (aged 68); Pistoia, Italy
- Occupations: Composer, conductor

Antonino Palminteri (3 October 1846 – 31 July 1915) was an Italian conductor and classical composer.

== Life and career ==
Born in Menfi, the son of a doctor, in 1970 Palminteri graduated in piano, counterpoint and harmony from the Palermo Conservatory, and a few years later he became "Maestrino" and "Concertatore" (Master Teacher and Concertmaster) in his alma mater. He then moved to Milan, where he succeeded Amilcare Ponchielli in the chair of counterpoint and harmony at the Milan Conservatory. Among his pupils were Giacomo Puccini, with whom in the following years he had an intense epistolary relationship.

His first opera, Arrigo II, with a libretto of Vincenzo Ramirez and focusing on Henry II, Holy Roman Emperor, premiered in 1878 at the Teatro Sociale in Monza, and was well received by audiences and critics. His second opera Amazilia, with a libretto of Angelo Zanardini, premiered in 1883 at the Teatro Dal Verme in Milan to great acclaim. In spite of the success, since then Palminteri focused on conducting, performing in the most important Italian opera houses as well as abroad, notably performing Donizetti's La favorite at the Alexandrinsky Theatre in Saint Petersburg in 1892. He also conducted opera performances in Moscow, Madrid, Buenos Aires, Valencia and Zadar.
