= Ádám Fischer =

Hungarian conductor

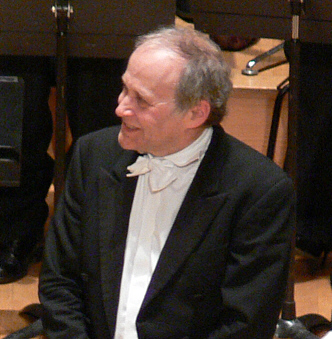
Ádám Fischer, 2008

Ádám Fischer (born 9 September 1949 in Budapest) is a Hungarian conductor. He is the general music director of the Austro-Hungarian Haydn Orchestra, chief conductor of the Danish Chamber Orchestra, and principal conductor of the Düsseldorf Symphony Orchestra.

== Biography ==
Ádám Fischer is an elder brother of the conductor Iván Fischer. The two belonged to the children's choir of Budapest National Opera house, and sang as two of the three boys in Mozart's Die Zauberflöte.

Fischer studied piano and composition at the Bartók Conservatory (hu) in Budapest, and conducting with Hans Swarowsky in Vienna. He also studied with Franco Ferrara at Accademia Chigiana in Siena. He won first prize in the Milan Guido Cantelli Competition. His career began with opera conducting in Munich, Freiburg, and other German cities. In 1982 he made his Paris Opéra debut, leading Der Rosenkavalier, and in 1986 he made his debut at La Scala, Milan, leading Die Zauberflöte. Between 1987 and 1992, he was the general music director in Kassel.

Fischer began a long collaboration with the Vienna State Opera in 1973. In January 2017, he was named an honorary member of the company.

In 1987, Fischer established the Austro-Hungarian Haydn Orchestra and started the Haydn Festival in the Austrian city of Eisenstadt. He has recorded the complete Haydn symphonies for the Nimbus label, the first digital recording of the cycle, with the orchestra. In July 1989, Fischer started the first Gustav Mahler Festivals in Kassel. In 1998, Fischer was appointed chief conductor of the Danish National Chamber Orchestra. Fischer has recorded the complete Opere serie by Wolfgang Amadeus Mozart with this orchestra, and is currently recording Mozart's complete symphonies.

At the end of 2010 Fischer resigned as Music Director of the Hungarian State Opera in protest against the controversial media law introduced in Hungary in 2011. Speaking in Brussels on 11 January 2011, he told reporters:

'A lot of the attention has focused on the new law but the problems run far deeper. Even more worrying are changes to the national constitution that are being drafted and the rise of anti-Semitism, homophobia and xenophobia in Hungarian society.'

Fischer joined with András Schiff, Miklós Jancsó, and others in an open letter condemning the Hungarian government's record on these issues.

In 2015, Fischer became principal conductor of the Düsseldorf Symphony Orchestra (Düsseldorfer Symphoniker). In September 2024, the orchestra announced the extension of Fischer's contract as principal conductor through 31 July 2030.

Fischer has recorded commercially for Nimbus, CBS, EMI, Hungaroton, Delta, Dacapo and Naxos. In 1982, he won the Grand Prix du Disque. In 2018, he was the laureate of the Wolf Prize in Arts.

== Sources ==
- (in German) Dr. Raab and Dr. Böhm Artist Management (Austria), official artist biography of Adam Fischer
- Friends of Ádám Fischer page

Cultural offices
Preceded by (no predecessor)	Chief Conductor, Österreichisch-Ungarische Haydn-Philharmonie; 1987–present	Succeeded by incumbent
Preceded by Andrey Boreyko	Chief Conductor, Düsseldorf Symphony Orchestra; 2015–present	Succeeded by incumbent
