= List of music directors of La Scala =

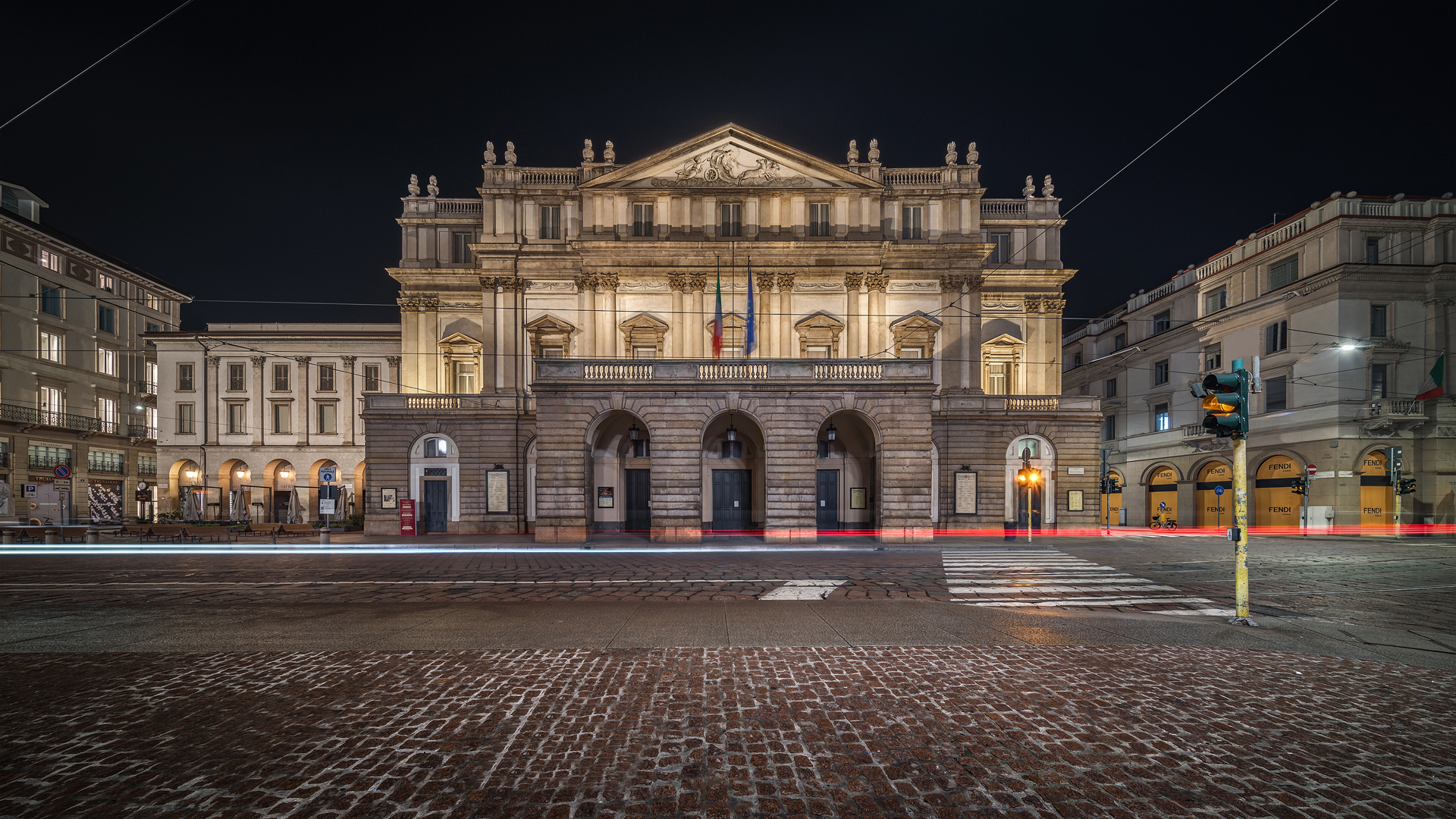
La Scala theater in Milan

The music director of La Scala (Italian: Direttore musicale del Teatro alla Scala) is the principal conductor and artistic leader of the orchestra of the Teatro alla Scala in Milan, Italy. The music director conducts opera and concert performances, leads rehearsals, and oversees the orchestra's musical interpretation and artistic development.

The position has been held by several of the leading conductors in the history of opera, including Arturo Toscanini, Guido Cantelli, Claudio Abbado, Riccardo Muti, Daniel Barenboim and Riccardo Chailly. Chailly's term as music director is scheduled to end in 2026, after which Myung-Whun Chung will assume the position.

The tenure of Guido Cantelli as music director of Teatro alla Scala was the shortest in the theatre's history. Cantelli was appointed Direttore stabile in November 1956, but died in an aircraft accident in Paris only days later. Cantelli also remains the only La Scala director to have died in office. Among the longest-serving music directors was Riccardo Muti, who led the theatre's orchestra from 1986 to 2005. The position has also at times been held under different titles, including Direttore stabile and Direttore musicale, reflecting changes in the organization and artistic structure of La Scala.

== Music directors ==
List of principal conductors and music directors of La Scala
No.	Portrait	Name (birth–death)	Term	Source(s)
1		Arturo Toscanini (1867–1957)	1898–1903	
2		Cleofonte Campanini (Note: Campanini was never formally appointed Direttore musicale or the former equivalent Direttore stabile. However, from 10 December 1903 until 20 December 1905 he was the sole conductor at La Scala.) (1860–1919)	1903–1905	
3		Leopoldo Mugnone (Note: Mugnone was never formally appointed Direttore musicale or the former equivalent Direttore stabile. However, from 26 December 1905 until the end of the 1905/06 season, he was the sole conductor at La Scala.) (1858–1941)	1905–1906	
4		Arturo Toscanini (1867–1957)	1906–1908	
5		Edoardo Vitale (Note: Vitale was never formally appointed Direttore musicale or the former equivalent Direttore stabile. However, from December 1908 until April 1910 he was the sole conductor at La Scala.) (1872–1937)	1908–1910	
6		Tullio Serafin (1878–1968)	1910–1914	
7		Gino Marinuzzi (Note: Marinuzzi was never formally appointed Direttore musicale or the former equivalent Direttore stabile. However, between 1914 and 1916, and 1935 and 1945 he was the primary engaged conductor at La Scala.) (1882–1945)	1914–1916	
8		Tullio Serafin (1878–1968)	1918	
9		Arturo Toscanini (Note: Toscanini was not formally appointed Direttore musicale or the former equivalent Direttore stabile in his 1921–1929 stint at La Scala. During this time he was, however, the primary engaged conductor at La Scala.) (1867–1957)	1921–1929	
10		Gino Marinuzzi (1882–1945)	1935–1945	
11		Victor de Sabata (Note: de Sabata was never formally appointed Direttore musicale or the former equivalent Direttore stabile. However, between 1947 and 1953 he was the primary engaged conductor at La Scala, and from 1949 until 1953 he was also Direttore Artistico.) (1892–1967)	1947–1949	
12		Franco Capuana (1894–1969)	1949–1951	
13		Victor de Sabata (1892–1967)	1951–1953 (Note: de Sabata was never formally appointed Direttore musicale or the former equivalent Direttore stabile. However, between 1947 and 1953 he was the primary engaged conductor at La Scala, and from 1949 until 1953 he was Direttore Artistico.)	
14		Carlo Maria Giulini (1914–2005)	1953–1956	
15		Guido Cantelli (1920–1956)	1956 (Note: Died in office)	
16		Antonino Votto (Note: Votto was never formally appointed Direttore musicale or the former equivalent Direttore stabile. However, between 1956 and 1961 he was the primary engaged conductor at La Scala.) (1896–1985)	1956–1961	
17		Gianandrea Gavazzeni (Note: Gavazzeni was never formally appointed Direttore musicale or the former equivalent Direttore stabile. However, between 1961 and 1966 he was the primary engaged conductor at La Scala. From 1966 to 1968 he was also Direttore Artistico.) (1909–1996)	1961–1968	
18		Claudio Abbado (1933–2014)	1968–1986	
19		Riccardo Muti (1941–)	1986–2005	
20		Daniel Barenboim (1942–)	2007–2014 (Note: From November 2007 to December 2011 Maestro Scaligero. From December 2011 to December 2014 Direttore musicale .)	
21		Riccardo Chailly (1953–)	2015–2026	

== See also ==
- La Scala
