= Figaro Systems =

American software company

Figaro Systems, Inc.
- Type: Private
- Founded: 1993
- Headquarters: Santa Fe, New Mexico, United States
- Key people: Patrick Markle, president and CEO, Geoff Webb, VP
- Website: figarosystems.com{dead link

Figaro Systems, Inc. is an American company that provides seatback and Wireless titling software and system installations to opera houses and other music performance venues worldwide. The company is based in Santa Fe, New Mexico. It was established in 1993 by Patrick Markle, Geoff Webb, and Ron Erkman and was the first company to provide assistive technology that enables individualized, simultaneous, multi-lingual dialogue and libretto-reading for audiences.

== History ==
Figaro Systems grew out of a conversation in 1992 among three opera colleagues: Patrick Markle, at that time Production Director of The Santa Fe Opera, Geoffrey Webb, Design Engineer for the Metropolitan Opera House in New York, and Ronald Erkman, then a technician for the Met. At that time, opera houses had two options for the display of libretto and dialogue subtitles: projection onto a large screen above the stage or onto smaller screens throughout the theatre. Typically, the translation was in a single language.

The Americans with Disabilities Act of 1990 had recently been enacted; Markle was trying to solve the problem of venues which lacked accessibility to patrons with disabilities, including the profoundly deaf. Markle, Webb, and Erkman devised the first prototype of a personal seatback titling device and John Crosby, then General Director of The Santa Fe Opera, saw its potential for opera patrons. Markle, Webb, and Erkman were further reinforced by their understanding of technology's role in remediating the physical barriers people encounter, worldwide, which frustrate or prevent their access to the visual performing arts. Markle, Webb, and Erkman applied for and were granted patents for their invention.

Philanthropist and investor Alberto Vilar counted Figaro Systems among the companies in which he was a majority shareholder. He donated the company's electronic libretto system to European venues including the Royal Opera House in London, La Scala's Teatro degli Arcimboldi in Milan, Italy, Gran Teatre del Liceu in Barcelona, Spain, and the Wiener Staatsoper in Wien, Austria. As a consequence of his failures to pay promised donations, most of these companies lost money.

In 2005 the Met charged the New Mexico company with unlawfully using its name in advertising promoting its "Simultext, system which defendant claims can display a simultaneous translation of an opera as it occurs on a stage and that defendant represented that its system is installed at the Met."

== Products and technology ==
The company's products are known variously as seat back titles, surtitles, electronic libretto systems, opera supertitles, projected titles, and libretto translations.

Opera venues have utilized the system to display librettos in English, French, German, Italian, Japanese, Mandarin, Russian, and Spanish although the software enables the reading of the libretto in any written language. Translation is provided by one screen and delivery system per person.

Typically, but not in all cases, the system is permanently installed along the backs of rows of seats. Each screen is positioned so that the text is clearly visible to each user. The displays were initially available in vacuum fluorescent display (VFD) and, in 2000, liquid-crystal display (LCD) was used. In 2004 the displays became available with organic light-emitting diode (OLED) screens. Each type of display provides the same text information and program annotation on eight channels simultaneously, may be turned off by the user, and is user-operated with a single button. The software is capable of supporting venues' existing systems as well as Figaro Systems' "Simultext" system. The software enables cueing of each line as it is sung, and it appears instantly on the screen.

The company builds fully modular systems including its Wireless handheld screens for users who cannot use seatback systems, for example people in wheelchairs, who may be viewing the opera in areas lacking seatback viewing, or people with compromised eyesight.

== Venues ==
In the US, the company's systems are in use in the Ellie Caulkins Opera House in Denver, Colorado, The Santa Fe Opera in Santa Fe, the Brooklyn Academy of Music the Metropolitan Opera, New York, where it is called "MetTitles"), the Roy E. Disney Theatre in Albuquerque's National Hispanic Cultural Center, McCaw Hall in Seattle, Washington, the Opera Theatre of St. Louis in St. Louis, Missouri, the Des Moines Metro Opera in Des Moines, Iowa, and the Lyric Opera of Kansas City, Missouri.

In the UK and Europe, the systems have been installed in venues including the Royal Opera House in London, the Teatro alla Scala and La Scala's Teatro degli Arcimboldi in Milan, Italy, the Gran Teatre del Liceu in Barcelona, Spain, and the Wiener Staatsoper in Wien, Austria.

== Awards ==
In 2001, the company won the Los Alamos Laboratories' Technology Commercialization Award for its Simultext system.

In 2008, the company's software was one of four finalists for the Excellence Award for Commercial Software awarded by the New Mexico Information Technology and Software Association.
