= Electronic libretto =

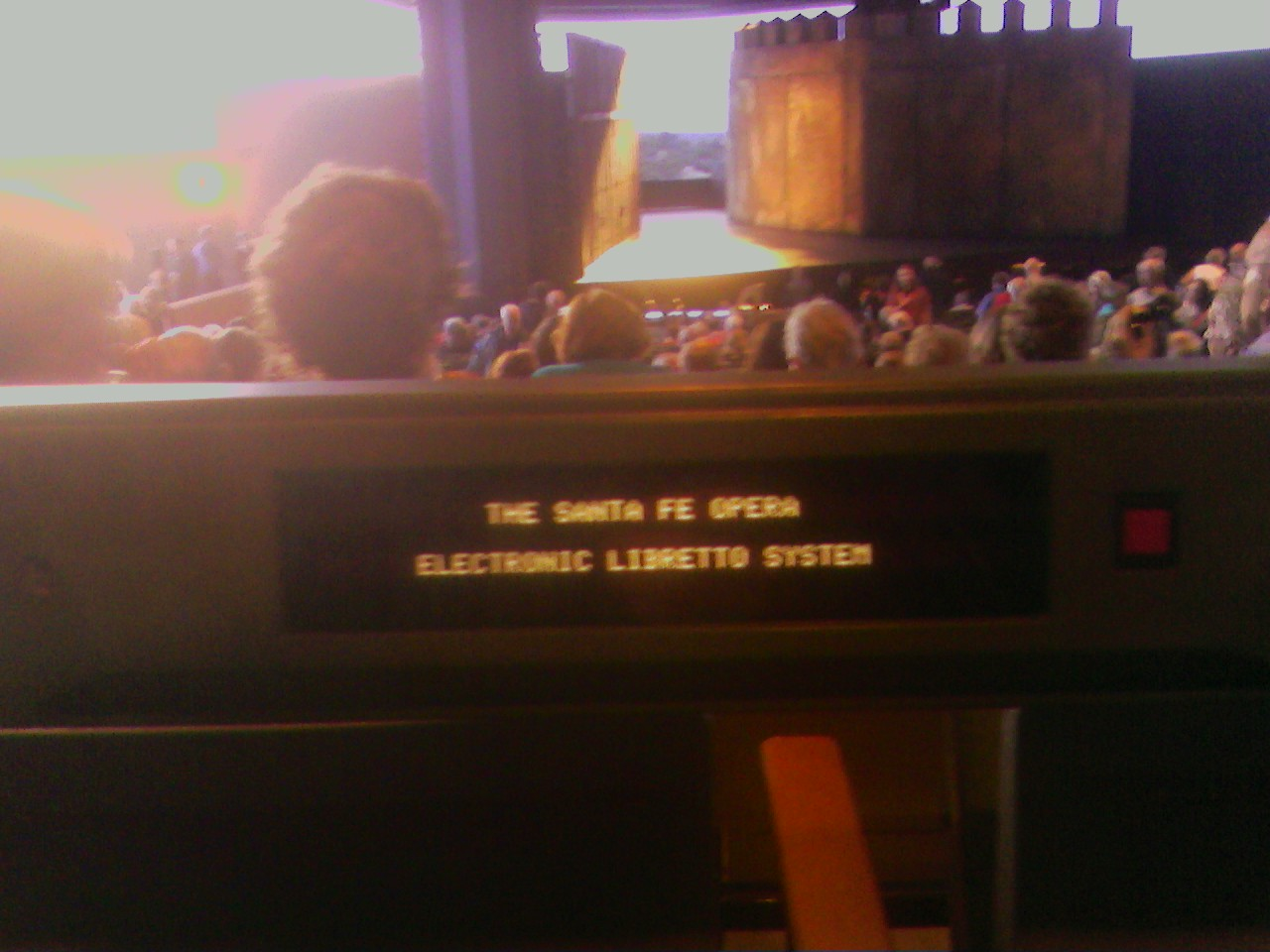
Personal subtitle system at the Santa Fe Opera

An electronic libretto system is a device used primarily in opera houses which presents translations of lyrics into an audience's language or transcribes lyrics that may be difficult to understand when sung.

Since 1983, projected supertitles or surtitles have been commonly used in opera or other theatrical and musical performances, and they have proven to be a commercial success in art forms such as opera which are generally performed in their original language. However, for many people, supertitles interfered with their enjoyment of a performance, because they tended to find themselves following the titles and not giving their full attention to the stage. This problem was answered by the development of an electronic libretto system, which utilizes individual screens placed on the back of each seat, thus allowing patrons either to view a translation or to switch them off during the performance.

Although initially developed by technicians at The Santa Fe Opera, the Metropolitan Opera was the first to install the system which they describe as Met Titles. In the U.S., the electronic libretto system was further developed and patented as "Simultext" by Figaro Systems of Santa Fe, New Mexico with The Santa Fe Opera becoming the second house to adopt it in 1999 after its 1997/98 refurbishment.

Opera houses such as the Valencia Opera House, the National Noh Theatre in Tokyo, the Vienna State Opera in Vienna, the Liceu in Barcelona, the Royal Opera House in London and the Teatro degli Arcimboldi and La Scala (both in Milan) have added the electronic titles, the latter providing English and Italian translations in addition to the original language of the opera.

Other companies have developed similar technologies, such as Sonoidea in Spain, Visutech in Denmark, Radio Marconi in Italy, 3Com in the United States, and Rokko Denki in Japan.

In the United States, these systems are now found at venues such as the Miami's Adrienne Arsht Center for the Performing Arts, Ellie Caulkins Opera House in Denver, Colorado, at the Des Moines Metro Opera, the Seattle Opera, Lyric Opera of Kansas City, and in the Roy O. Disney Theatre, a part of the National Hispanic Cultural Center in Albuquerque, New Mexico.

Electronic libretto technology, which costs about $1,000 per seat, has been added or planned for during initial construction (as was the case with Santa Fe where it was added one year after the opening of the third opera house in 1998) or during planned renovation (as with La Scala during its two-year closure period). Installations in the Metropolitan Opera, La Scala and the Arcimboldi, the Vienna State Opera, Liceu, and the Royal Opera House were possible with the donations of the philanthropist Alberto Vilar, at the time a majority shareholder of Figaro Systems.

A newer type of electronic libretto is the Marconi multimedia patented interactive electronic libretto technology, installed in 2011 in the Royal Opera House Muscat, Sultanate of Oman and in 2013 at the Musiktheater Linz, Vienna State Opera Austria and the Stavros Niarchos Foundation Cultural Center in Athens. It allows audience members to view videos, texts, theatre information, or surveys, as well as ask for assistance, through touchscreens. It also contains embedded marketing, donation and merchandising features.
