= Surtitles =

Dialogue presented above a stage or screen

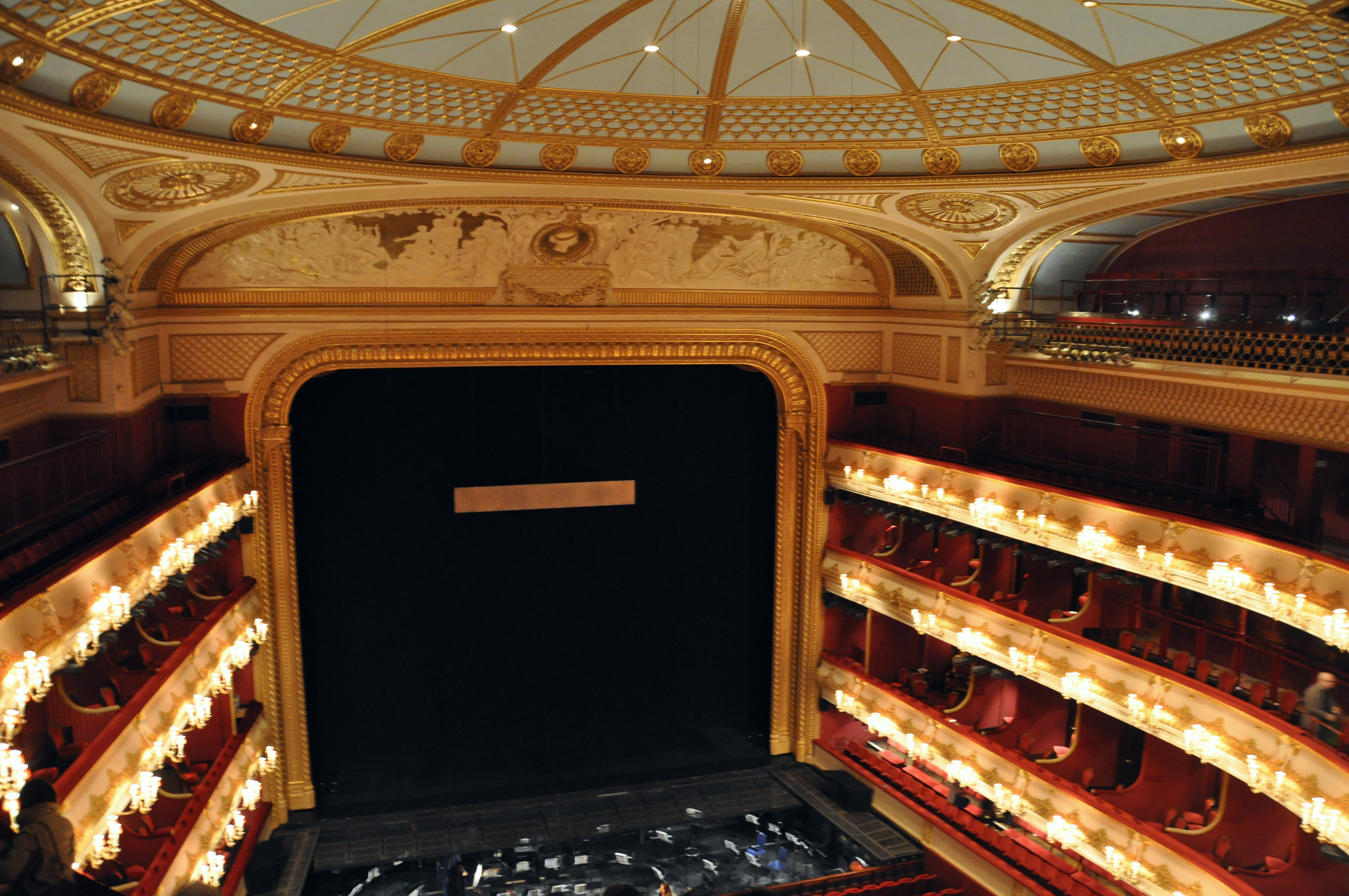
Blank surtitle screen visible above the stage at the Royal Opera House, Covent Garden

Surtitles, also known as supertitles, SurCaps and OpTrans, are translated or transcribed lyrics/dialogue projected above a stage or displayed on a screen, commonly used in opera, theatre or other musical performances. The word "surtitle" comes from the French-language sur, meaning "over" or "on", and the English language word "title", formed in a similar way to the related and similarly named subtitles. The word Surtitle is a trademark of the Canadian Opera Company.

Surtitles came into widespread use in the 1990s to translate the meaning of the lyrics into the audience's language or to transcribe lyrics that may be difficult to understand in the sung form in the opera-house auditoria. The two possible types of presentation of surtitles are as projected text or as the electronic libretto system. Titles in the theatre have proven a commercial success in areas such as opera and are finding increased use for allowing hearing-impaired patrons to enjoy theatre productions more fully. Surtitles are used in live productions in the same way as subtitles are used in film and television productions.

On Broadway, these were used in 1964 for a production of "Rugantino", imported directly from Rome.

== Projected titles or translations ==
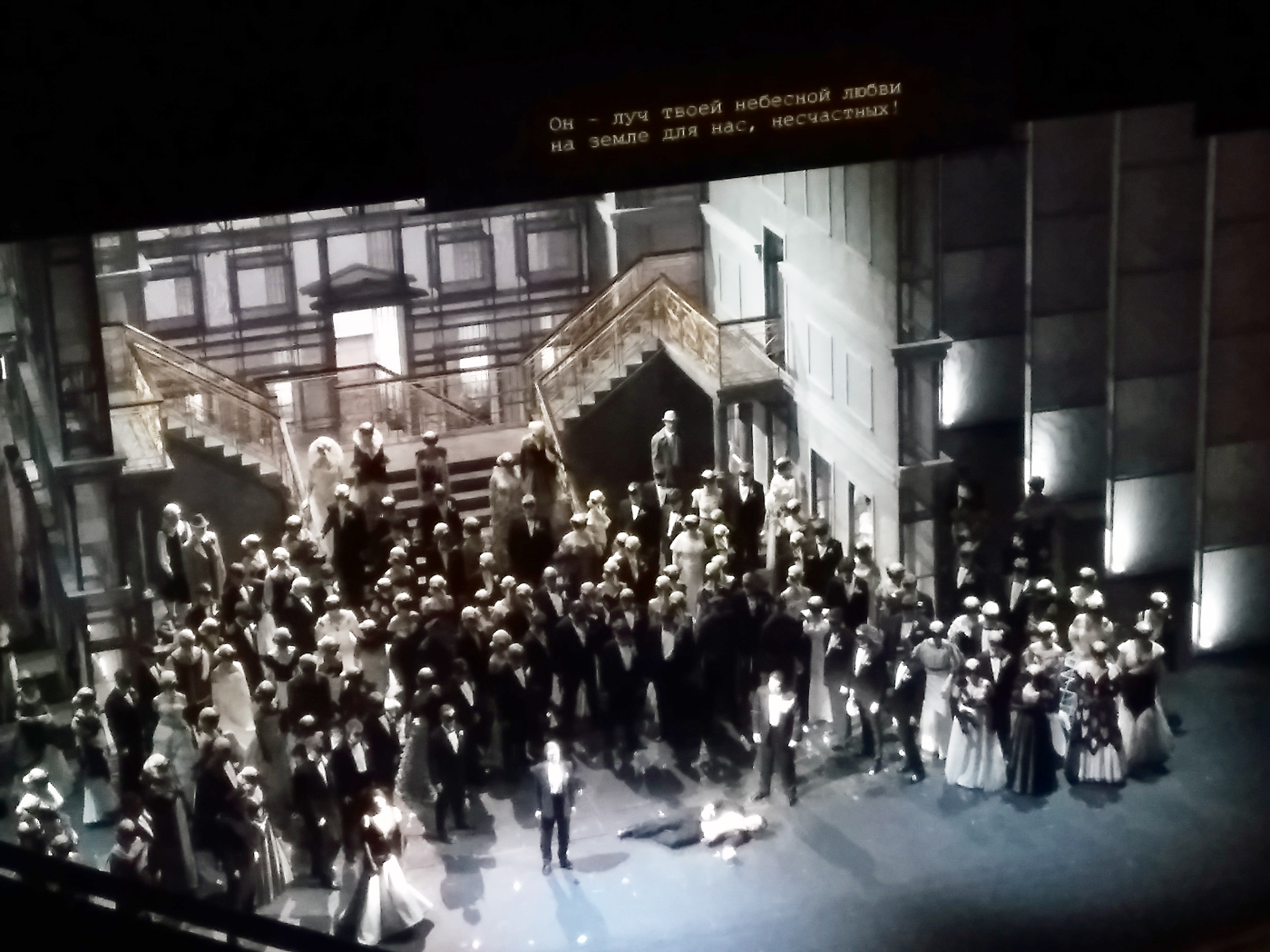
Opera Un ballo in maschera in Moscow with Russian surtitles

Generally projected above the theatre's proscenium arch (but, alternately, on either side of the stage), surtitles are usually displayed using a supertitling machine. The text must be prepared beforehand, as in subtitles. These machines can be used for events other than artistic performances, when the text is easier to show to the audience than it is to vocalize.

Surtitles are different from subtitles, which are more often used in filmmaking and television production. Originally, translations would be broken up into small chunks and photographed onto slides that could be projected onto a screen above the stage, but most companies now use a combination of video projectors and computers.

Supertitles were first developed and used by Sonya Friedman, who began using them for televised operas in the late 1970s. Lotfi Mansouri, then general director of the Canadian Opera Company, hired Friedman to use the system for the first time in a live performance during the January 1983 staging of Elektra. John Leberg then developed the trademarked Surtitle system for the Canadian Opera Company when he was the company's director of operations.

New York City Opera was the first American opera company to use supertitles, in 1983.

The surtitle is given an insertion point in the score (piano score) for the surtitle's entry and exit. An operator pushes a button at the marked point when following the music.

The American company called Figaro Systems established by Patrick Markle, Geoff Webb, and Ron Erkman developed the first assistive technology for individualized libretto-reading for audiences. This technology allows the audience to select their preferred language from a list or simply turn it off, watching the performance without surtitles.

== Personal titling systems ==
Surtitles can be a distraction, focusing attention on the titles instead of the stage. Therefore, several systems have been developed to provide captions visible only to those individual viewers who wish to see them.

=== Electronic libretto system ===
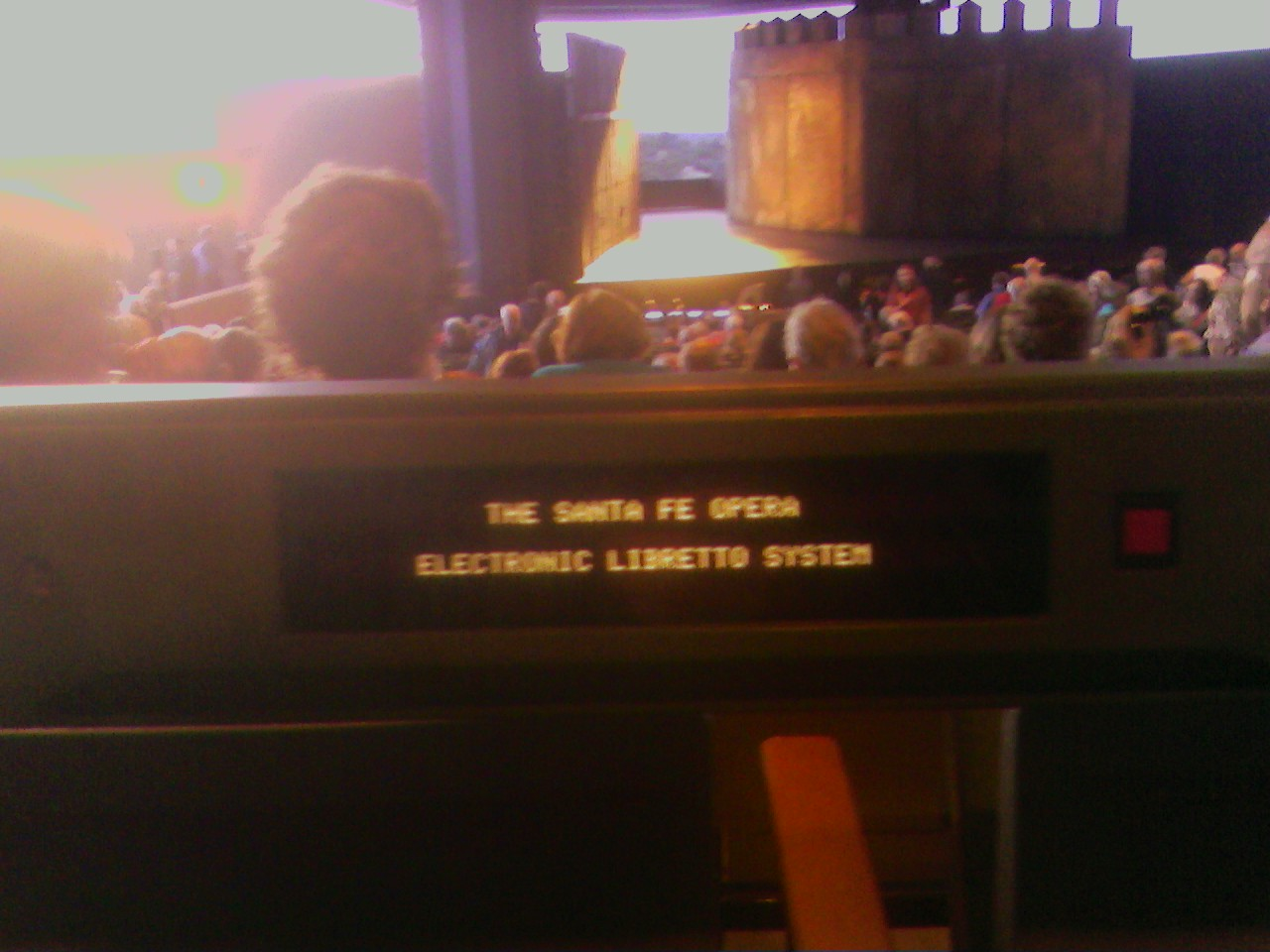
Personal subtitle system at the Santa Fe Opera

The electronic libretto system uses individual screens placed in front of each seat allowing patrons either to view a translation or to switch them off during the performance. New York's Metropolitan Opera installed the patented Met Titles, becoming the first house in the United States to use this system.

The Vienna State Opera and Santa Fe Opera use such a system. It allows the patron to choose among several different languages.

=== Rear Window Captioning System ===
The Rear Window Captioning System is a method for presenting, through captions, a transcript of the audio portion of a film in theatres. The system was co-developed by WGBH and Rufus Butler Seder and initially targeted at people who are deaf or hard-of-hearing.

On the way into the theatre, viewers pick up a reflective plastic panel mounted on a flexible stalk. The panel sits in a seat cupholder or on the floor adjacent to the seat. A large LED display is mounted on a rear wall that displays caption characters in mirror image. Viewers move the panels into position (usually below the movie screen or stage) so they can read the reflected captions and watch the presentation. Others seated alongside do not watch, or usually even see, the captions.

== Surtitling smart glasses ==
After a successful test run in 2015, the French-German surtitling company Panthea launched a pilot project on a larger scale introducing multilingual surtitles on smartglasses to the Festival d'Avignon 2017.

The system was the subject of a study which was later published by the French Ministry of Culture. The device became commercially available the following year and was tested by several houses, such as the Paris Opera. The Theatre Times' test user report that: "Supertitles are displayed on the lenses during the performance so that you can concentrate more on what is happening on the stage rather than reading supertitles."

In October 2019, the Théâtre Édouard VII, in partnership with Panthea and the Fondation pour l'audition (a non-profit foundation for the hearing-impaired), became the first Parisian theatre to offer surtitling smart glasses for a full season, providing the service at no extra cost for audience members with hearing impairments.

== Surtitling tools ==
Modern surtitling systems typically use computer software to prepare, edit and display titles during live performances. Unlike conventional subtitle editors, which generally synchronize text to prerecorded video using timecodes, surtitling systems may allow an operator to trigger individual titles manually in response to the timing of a live performance. Some systems also support multiple languages, text formatting, projection to external displays, and integration with individual captioning devices or other accessibility systems.

== See also ==
- Same language subtitling
- Closed captioning
- Karaoke
- Radio Marconi
