= Tullio Serafin =

Italian conductor

Tullio Serafin with his daughter in 1924.

Tullio Serafin (1 September 1878 – 2 February 1968) was an Italian conductor who specialised in the operatic repertoire. He was Musical Director at La Scala on three occasions.

== Biography ==
Tullio Serafin was a leading Italian opera conductor with a long career and a broad repertoire who revived many 19th-century bel canto operas by Bellini, Rossini and Donizetti to become staples of 20th-century repertoire. He had a high reputation as a coach of young opera singers and famously harnessed and developed both Renata Tebaldi's and Maria Callas's considerable talents.

Born in Rottanova (Cavarzere), near Venice, and trained in Milan, he played viola in the Orchestra of La Scala, Milan under Arturo Toscanini, later being appointed Assistant Conductor. He took over as Music Director at La Scala when Toscanini left to go to New York, and served 1909–1914, 1917–1918, and returned briefly after the Second World War, 1946–1947.

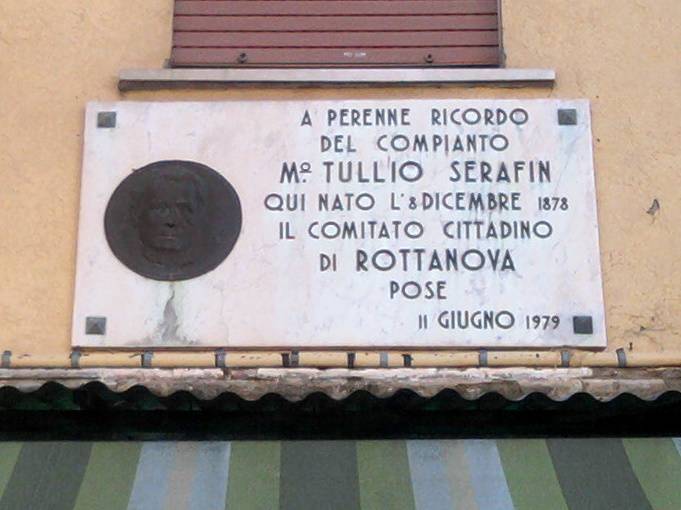
Tullio Serafin plaque (Rottanova, Cavarzere)

He joined the conducting staff of the Metropolitan Opera in 1924, and remained for a decade, after which he became the artistic director of the Teatro Reale in Rome. During his long career he helped further the careers of many important singers, including Rosa Ponselle, Magda Olivero, Joan Sutherland, Renata Tebaldi, and most notably Maria Callas, with whom he collaborated on many recordings.

Maestro Serafin was much appreciated in Buenos Aires. During nine seasons at the Teatro Colón between 1914 and 1951, he conducted 368 opera performances of 63 operas. This included many operas that are seldom performed, by composers such as Alfano, Catalani, Giordano, Massenet, Montemezzi, Monteverdi, Pizzetti, Respighi, Rimsky-Korsakov, and Zandonai.

Serafin was instrumental in expanding the repertoire, conducting the Italian premieres of works by Alban Berg, Paul Dukas, and Benjamin Britten. He also conducted important world premieres by both Italian and American composers, such as Franco Alfano, Italo Montemezzi, Deems Taylor, and Howard Hanson.

His goddaughter was the soprano Claudia Pinza Bozzolla.

== Studio discography ==
- Verdi Requiem (Caniglia, Stignani, Gigli, Pinza; 1939) EMI
- Un ballo in maschera (Caniglia, Barbieri, Gigli, Bechi; 1943) EMI
- The Barber of Seville (de los Ángeles, Monti, Bechi, Luise, Rossi-Lemeni; 1952) EMI
- Lucia di Lammermoor (Callas, di Stefano, Gobbi, Arié; 1953) EMI
- I puritani (Callas, di Stefano, Panerai, Rossi-Lemeni; 1953) EMI
- Cavalleria rusticana (Callas, di Stefano, Panerai; 1953) EMI
- Norma (Callas, Stignani, Filippeschi, Rossi-Lemeni; 1954) EMI
- Pagliacci (Callas, di Stefano, Monti, Gobbi, Panerai; 1954) EMI
- La forza del destino (Callas, Tucker, Tagliabue, Rossi-Lemeni; 1954) EMI
- Aida (Callas, Barbieri, Tucker, Gobbi, Modesti, Zaccaria; 1955) EMI
- Rigoletto (Callas, di Stefano, Gobbi, Zaccaria; 1955) EMI
- La traviata (Stella, di Stefano, Gobbi; 1955) EMI
- Linda di Chamounix (Stella, Valletti, Taddei, Barbieri, Capecchi, Modesti; 1956) Philips
- Moïse et Pharaon (Mancini, Danieli, Filippeschi, Lazzari, Taddei, Rossi-Lemeni, Clabassi; 1956) Philips
- Turandot (Callas, Schwarzkopf, Fernandi, Zaccaria; 1957) EMI
- Manon Lescaut (Callas, di Stefano, Fioravanti; 1957) EMI
- Médée (Callas, Scotto, Pirazzini, Picchi, Modesti; 1957) Ricordi
- Suor Angelica (de los Ángeles, Barbieri; 1957) EMI
- Tosca (Stella, Poggi, Taddei; 1957) Philips
- L'elisir d'amore (Carteri, Alva, Panerai, Taddei; 1958) EMI
- Madama Butterfly (Tebaldi, Cossotto, Bergonzi, Sordello; 1958) Decca
- Mefistofele (Tebaldi, Danieli, del Monaco, Siepi; 1958) Decca
- Lucia di Lammermoor (Callas, Tagliavini, Cappuccilli, Ładysz; 1959) EMI
- La traviata (de los Angeles, Dal Monte, Sereni; 1959) EMI
- La bohème (Tebaldi, d'Angelo, Bergonzi, Bastianini, Siepi; 1959) Decca
- Cavalleria rusticana (Del Monaco, Simionato, MacNeil; 1959) Decca
- Norma (Callas, Ludwig, Corelli, Zaccaria; 1960) EMI
- Otello (Rysanek, Vickers, Gobbi; 1960) RCA Victor
- Il trovatore (Stella, Cossotto, Bergonzi, Bastianini; 1962) Deutsche Grammophon
- Isabeau (Pobbé, Ferraro, Rola; 1962) Cetra

Cultural offices
Preceded by Arturo Toscanini	Musical Directors, La Scala, Milan; 1909–1914	Succeeded by unknown
Preceded by unknown	Musical Directors, La Scala, Milan; 1917–1918	Succeeded by Arturo Toscanini
