= Sonya Friedman (translator) =

American translator

Sonya Friedman is an American translator and subtitler. She is the first writer of supertitles, translations of foreign-language opera libretti projected over the stage during performances.

== Career ==
Born in Philadelphia, Friedman began working for Metro-Goldwyn-Mayer in the 1940s as both a subtitler and a dialogue writer. She eventually went freelance and traveled to Italy to write English subtitles for the films by Vittorio De Sica and Roberto Rossellini. She spent three decades as a subtitler for both foreign films translated into English, often for French, Italian, and German, which she is fluent in, and foreign subtitles for American films. She has also made English subtitles for other languages, such as Ingmar Bergman's Swedish films and the Spanish version of Mr. Roger's Neighborhood. After this period, she began subtitling televised opera productions, her first being the 1976 production of The Barber of Seville by the New York City Opera. The success of this effort resulted in her being hired to subtitle other operas shown in theatres across the United States.

Friedman was hired in 1977 by PBS to write subtitles for their Live from the Metropolitan Opera series and was re-hired for multiple subsequent Met televised productions. Her first application of her idea of supertitles as a translation method for a live opera performance was during a 1983 production of Elektra by the Canadian Opera Company. The director of the New York City Opera, Beverly Sills, attended the performance and observed the new use of supertitles, which led her to request that Friedman also supply supertitles for their production of Cendrillon. This was so successful that she was chosen to supertitle all 12 operas for that year's season.

Friedman's work received some resistance and criticism initially, including her particular translations of the operas. She responded with an example of the 1986 production of Carmen in New York City that re-imagined the storyline from being about gypsy smugglers in 1800 to the Spanish Civil War in the 1930s. Because of this, Friedman frequently avoided direct translations of the words spoken, but also included context for what was happening to explain these drastic differences from the original written versions of the operas. She also admitted that certain phrasing in opera is difficult to translate to English in an understandable and elegant manner, with a direct translation just causing confusion, often leading her to change her mind frequently across showings on how to properly phrase certain translated lines.
