= Institut de l'audition =

Hearing research laboratory

Coordinates: 48°51′1.739″N 2°22′24.421″E

- Founders: National Center for Scientific Research, Institut Pasteur, Inserm, Fondation pour l'audition
- Established: 27 February 2020
- Mission: hearing
- director: Anne-Lise Giraud
- Address: 63 Rue de Charenton, 75012 Paris
- Location: France
- Website: www.institut-audition.fr

The Institut de l'audition is a laboratory of the Pasteur Institute (Paris) working on basic and medical research on hearing, inaugurated on February 27, 2020, by Prime Minister Édouard Philippe. It is a unité mixte de recherche between the Institut Pasteur and Inserm which includes scientific staff from the Institut Pasteur, Inserm and CNRS. It benefits from the support and financial support of the Fondation pour l'audition.

The Institut de l'audition aims to bring together doctors, researchers but also innovation players, industrialists, associations and patients.
