= Santa Fe Opera =

Opera company in Santa Fe, New Mexico

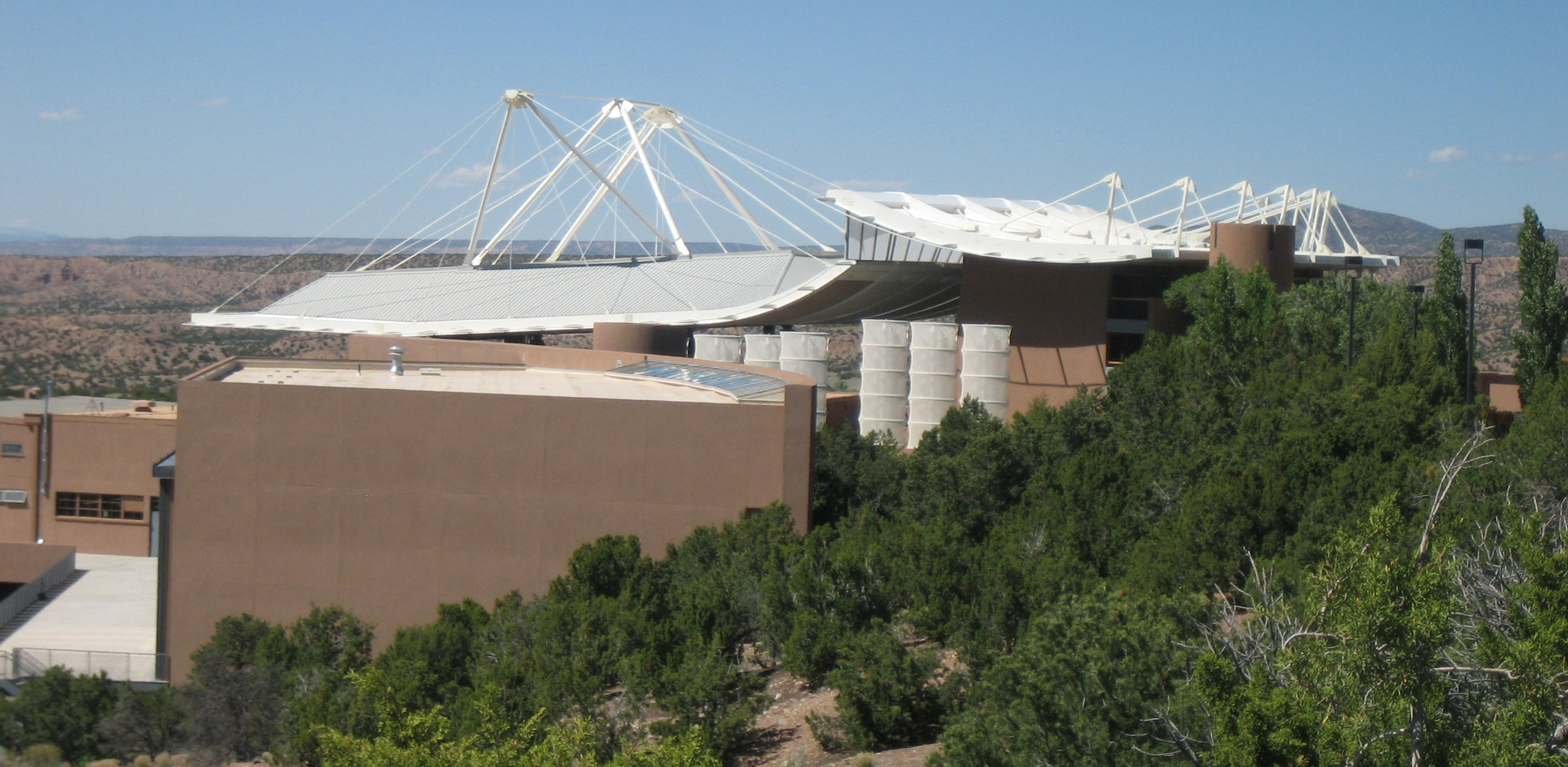
- Santa Fe Opera's Crosby Theatre
- Interactive map of Santa Fe Opera
- Address: 301 Opera Drive; Santa Fe, New Mexico; United States
- Coordinates: 35°45′50″N 105°56′49″W
- Capacity: 2128 plus 106 standees
- Current use: performing arts center

Construction
- Opened: July 3, 1957
- Rebuilt: 1968, 1998
- Architect: 1998 rebuild: James Polshek

Website
- www.santafeopera.org

Santa Fe Opera (SFO) is an American opera company, located 7 miles (11 km) north of Santa Fe, New Mexico. After creating the Opera Association of New Mexico in 1956, its founding director, John Crosby, oversaw the building of the first opera house on a newly acquired former guest ranch of 199 acres (0.81 km^{2}). The company has presented operas each summer festival season since July 1957, and is internationally known for introducing new operas as well as for its productions of the standard operatic repertoire. Five operas are presented each season during the summer.

Since its inception, Santa Fe Opera has staged 45 American premieres and 19 world premieres, including Emmeline, The Tempest, The (R)evolution of Steve Jobs, Adriana Mater, and Cold Mountain.

== General history ==
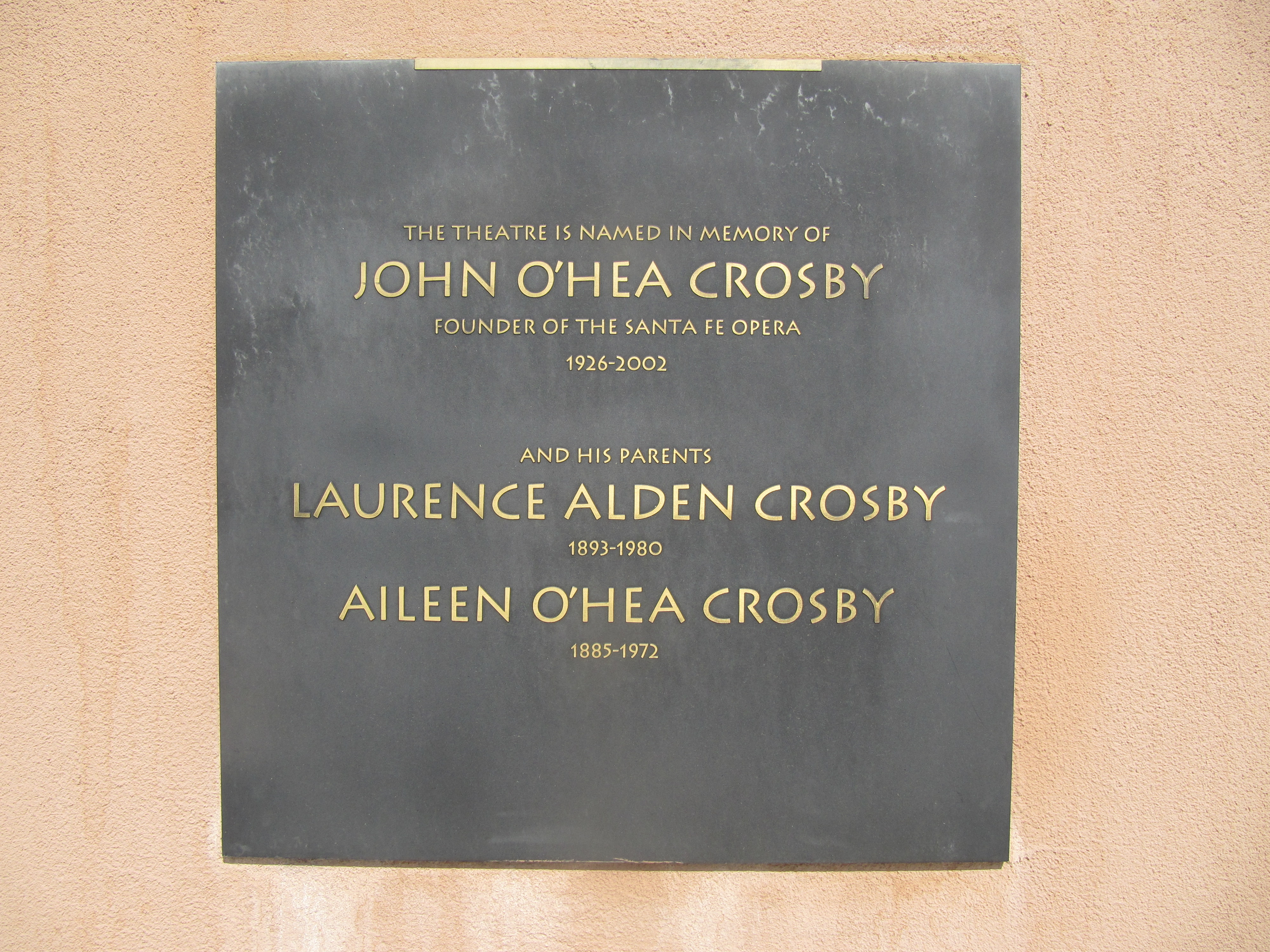
Plaque outside the Crosby Theatre commemorating the contributions of the founding general director, John Crosby, and his parents Laurence and Aileen

John Crosby, who was a New York-based conductor, founded the company in 1956, initially with the financial support of his parents, who helped in the acquisition of the land and the building of the first opera house. One goal was to give American singers the opportunity to learn and perform new roles while having ample time for rehearsal and preparation in the context of a summer festival situation with the presentation of five operas in repertory. Its first season began on July 3, 1957, with a performance of Puccini's Madama Butterfly with a seating capacity of nearly 500.

Crosby remained as general director until 2000, the longest general directorship in US opera history. Richard Gaddes served as the company's general director from 2000 through 2008. In November 2007, SFO named Charles MacKay the company's third general director, effective October 1, 2008. In August 2017, the company announced the intention of MacKay to stand down as its general director after the 2018 season.

In addition to being the opera company's founding general director, Crosby had simultaneously served as its de facto first principal conductor. Alan Gilbert became the company's first music director from 2003 to 2006. Kenneth Montgomery, a regular guest conductor starting in 1982, served as interim music director for the 2007 season. In July 2007, Edo de Waart was named as chief conductor, effective October 1, 2007, with an initial contract of four years. He was the first conductor to hold that title with the company. However, in November 2008, the company announced that de Waart stepped down from the post before the end of his contract, with de Waart citing health and family reasons for this decision. In May 2010, the company announced the appointment of Frédéric Chaslin as the company's next chief conductor, effective October 1, 2010, with an initial contract of three years. However, in August 2012, Chaslin resigned as the Opera's chief conductor. In April 2013, the company announced simultaneously the appointments of Harry Bicket as its next chief conductor, effective October 1, 2013, and of Montgomery as conductor laureate for the 2013 season. In November 2016, the company announced the extension of Bicket's contract as chief conductor through September 30, 2020.

In February 2018, the company announced the appointments of Robert K. Meya as its next general director and of Alexander Neef as its first-ever artistic director, and the elevation of Harry Bicket from chief conductor of the company to its music director, with the three appointments effective as of October 1, 2018. In October 2018, the company announced the extension of Bicket's contract as music director through the 2023 season. Neef stood down as artistic director in 2021, following his appointment to the Opéra national de Paris. In February 2021, the company announced the appointment of David Lomelí to its newly created post of chief artistic officer, a combination of the past posts of artistic director and director of artistic administration, effective May 1, 2021.

In May 2026, the company announced the most recent extension of Bicket's contract as music director through the 2028 season, and the appointment of Iván López Reynoso as its new principal conductor, effective with the 2027 season.

== Programming and organizational philosophy ==
From the beginning, certain characteristics of what was to become a typical season emerged. It runs annually from late June or the beginning of July to the third week of August, with five operas presented in rotating repertory.

Generally, from the time of Crosby's inception of the company, two popular operas opened the season. An American (or world) premiere was generally in the program and these included works commissioned by the company. A lifelong lover of the operas of Richard Strauss, Crosby regularly scheduled one and presented many American premieres of the composer’s work, an example being the 1964 U.S. premiere of the 1938 Daphne. Finally, the fifth opera was often a rarely performed work. The same philosophy continues to the present day. For modern works, US premiere productions of contemporary operas include Thomas Adès' The Tempest (2006), Tan Dun's Tea: A Mirror of Soul, Kaija Saariaho's Adriana Mater, the July 2009 world premiere of The Letter by composer Paul Moravec and librettist Terry Teachout, and the first full production of Lewis Spratlan's Life Is a Dream in July 2010. World premieres have included Theodore Morrison's Oscar (2013), Jennifer Higdon's Cold Mountain (2015), Mason Bates and Mark Campbell's The (R)evolution of Steve Jobs (2017), and M. Butterfly (2022), an adaptation of the play of the same name. Other contemporary operas presented at Santa Fe Opera have included Doctor Atomic. Their most recent world premiere was Gregory Spears and Tracy K. Smith's The Righteous, during the 2024 season.

During the COVID-19 pandemic, the company introduced the new position of Covid Compliance and Safety Manager. Along with development of protocols for staff to function within the premises, the company presented simulcasts of the dress rehearsals and shows were broadcast outside as a drive-in theater. In the 2021 season, Santa Fe Opera gave four productions and returned to five the following year.

=== Leadership ===
General Directors

- John Crosby (1957–2000)
- Richard Gaddes (2000–2008)
- Charles MacKay (2008–2018)
- Robert Meya (2018–present)

Conductors in leadership positions

- John Crosby (1957–2000, de facto principal conductor)
- Alan Gilbert (2003–2006, music director)
- Kenneth Montgomery (2007, acting music director)
- Edo de Waart (2007–2009, chief conductor)
- Frédéric Chaslin (2010–2012, chief conductor)
- Kenneth Montgomery (2013, conductor laureate)
- Harry Bicket (2013–2018, chief conductor; 2018–present, music director)

=== Apprentice programs ===
In his first season, Crosby created the Apprentice Singer Program, whereby eight young people were to be given living expenses and paid per performance to be members of the chorus and to cover (understudy) major roles. Unusual for its time in America in the 1950s, the Apprentice Singers Program helped young singers to make the transition from academic to professional life. To date, over 2,000 aspiring opera singers have participated. As Crosby noted:

"In this country young artists have to do something which is impossible – gain experience. But with our plan, these young people will be scheduled in small roles and will have the opportunity of working with their older brothers and sisters who have already won their spurs. To get such experience now, a young artist has to go to Europe."

The Apprentice Program for Technicians was added in 1965.

The program has formal academic goals in addition to the "hands on" experience provided by the preparation for and participation in professional productions. Seminars and master classes are conducted; singers receive coaching in voice, music, body movement, career counseling, and diction. Technical apprentices are provided with instruction in stage operations, stage properties, costume and wig construction, scenic art, wigs and make up, music services, and stage lighting.

The Apprentice Program for Singers and Technicians continues at The Santa Fe Opera today. Typically, about 1,000 aspiring young singers and 600 technicians apply; in 2025, almost 40 singers and 85 technical apprentices worked at the opera. The Santa Fe Opera offers the only technician apprentice program at an opera house with a budget larger than $15 million in the U.S.

The singers act as the chorus for each opera, as well as performing small roles. In addition, apprentices "cover" some leading roles, and on occasion have been known to have performed, replacing contracted singers who have been indisposed.

The Technical Apprentices perform a variety of backstage functions. They are divided into five separate running crews: costumes, scenery, electrics, properties, and production/music services. These five crews perform the majority of work on the daily changeovers between the five operas of the summer season and also fill positions crucial to the live running of productions. At the end of the summer, the apprentice crews are invited to apply for staff positions for the two weekends of "Apprentice Scenes", a showcase for the apprentice singers, and can serve as everything from costume and lighting designers, to lighting and stage supervisors, to follow spot operators and assistant stage managers and more. There is even an apprentice technicians' program for young local high school students who can use what they've learned in school and bring it to a worksite.

=== Notable past apprentices ===
Some major American opera singers who have been company apprentices include the sopranos Sylvia D’Eramo (2018–19), Rachel Willis-Sørensen (2010), Susanna Phillips (2004), Judith Blegen (1961), Celena Shafer (1999–2000) and Ashley Putnam (1973 and 1975); mezzos Kate Lindsey (2003), Joyce DiDonato (1995), and Susan Quittmeyer (1978); tenors Michael Fabiano (2005), Brandon Jovanovich (1996–97), Carl Tanner (1992,93), William Burden (1989–90), Richard Croft (1978), Chris Merritt (1974–75), and Neil Shicoff (1973); countertenor John Holiday (2011); baritones Michael Chioldi (1992–93), David Gockley (1965–67; later general manager of the Houston Grand Opera and the San Francisco Opera), and Sherrill Milnes (1959); and basses Mark Doss (1983), James Morris (1969) and Samuel Ramey (1966).

Many former apprentice singers have returned to perform major roles with the company. These have included Mark Doss in the 2011 Faust; Joyce DiDonato in the 2006 Cendrillon (and again in 2013 in La donna del lago); Chris Merritt also in 2006 in The Tempest; Carl Tanner in the 2005 production of Turandot; and Joyce El-Khoury (2006 and 2008 Apprentice Singer) as Micaëla in the 2014 production of Carmen. Beth Clayton, an apprentice singer during the 1995 season, returned in 2002 in the production of Eugene Onegin. ^{)} In recent seasons, Michael Fabiano appeared in Carmen in 2022; Rachel Willis-Sørensen returned in 2024 for Der Rosenkavalier, and Michael Chioldi as the title character in Rigoletto in 2025. Sylvia D’Eramo appeared in La bohème in 2025 and will return in 2026 for the American premiere of Lili Elbe.

== Theatres and other facilities ==
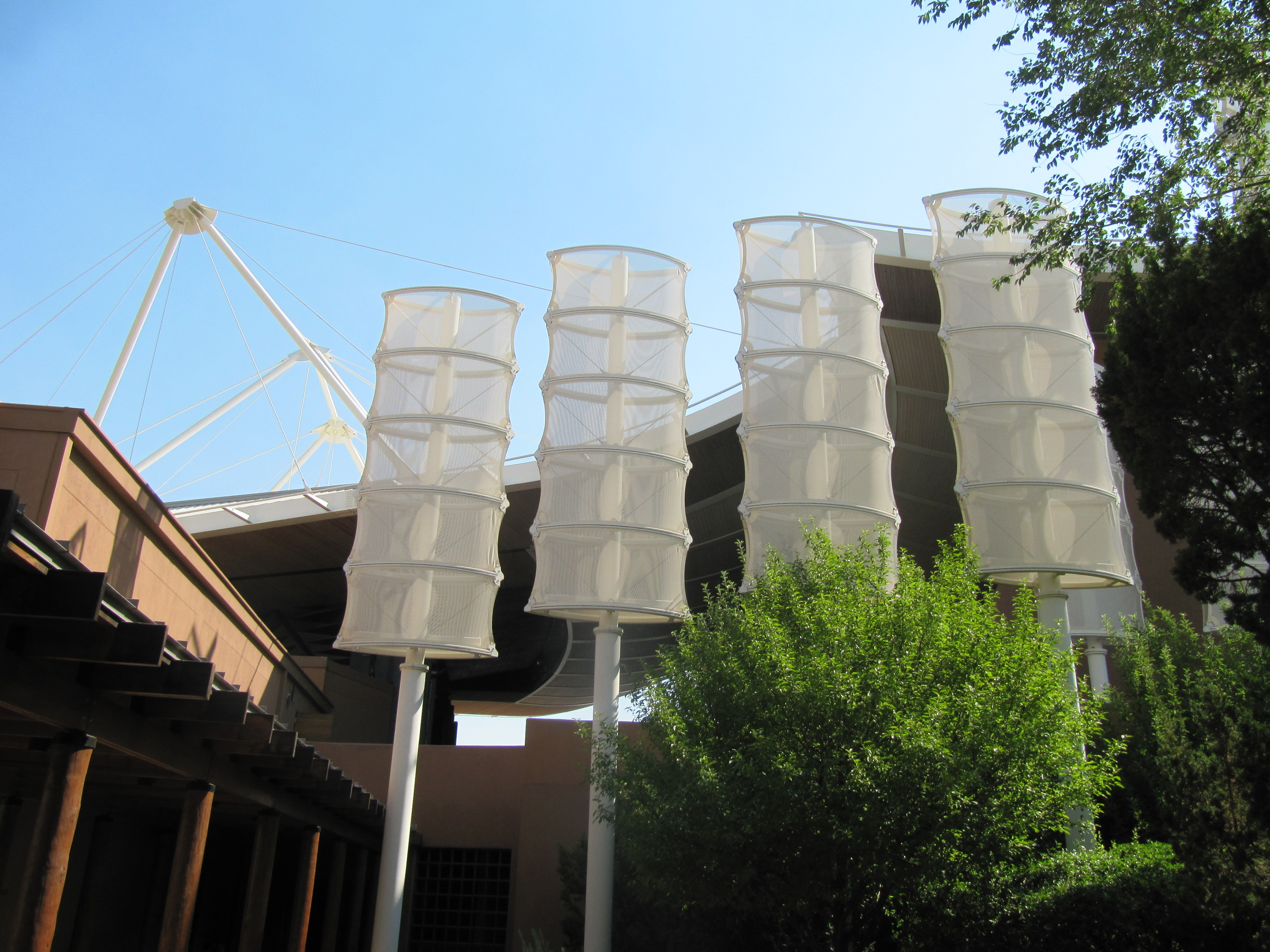
Wind and rain baffles on the south side of the theatre

There have been three theatres on the present site of The Santa Fe Opera's approximately (now) 150 acres of land. Each has been located on the same site on a mesa, with the audience facing West toward an ever-changing horizon of sunsets and thunderstorms, frequently visible throughout many productions when no backdrops are used. In the first two theaters, the exposure to weather caused occasional cancellations, postponements, or extended intermissions. The rain, the want to improve acoustics, improve patron facilities, comply with the Americans with Disabilities Act, and provide more seating led to the making of the Crosby Theater.

Four features distinguish each of the Santa Fe Opera theaters from any conventional opera house. There is no fly system to allow for scenery to be lowered from above. There is no proscenium arch which does not include a curtain and no means for projecting surtitles. And the sides of the house are open, and the rear of the stage may be completely opened to provide westward views. Additionally, the Opera features one of two Electronic Libretto Systems- a small touchscreen in front of each seat that allows the individual patron to select English, Spanish, or no simultext translation. Though developed for Santa Fe Opera, the first place the ELS was installed is the Metropolitan Opera in New York City.

Performances begin close to sunset, so that the lighting of the productions is not compromised by the sides of the theatre being open to the outside environment. Since the 2011 season, the starting time has been moved up by one half-hour from the original 9pm time. The start time is moved up again at the end of July or beginning of August to 8pm. More social aspects of the performance starting time include giving opera-goers the opportunity to observe New Mexico sunsets against the surrounding landscape and the tradition of tailgate dining.

=== Original theatre, 1957 to 1967 ===
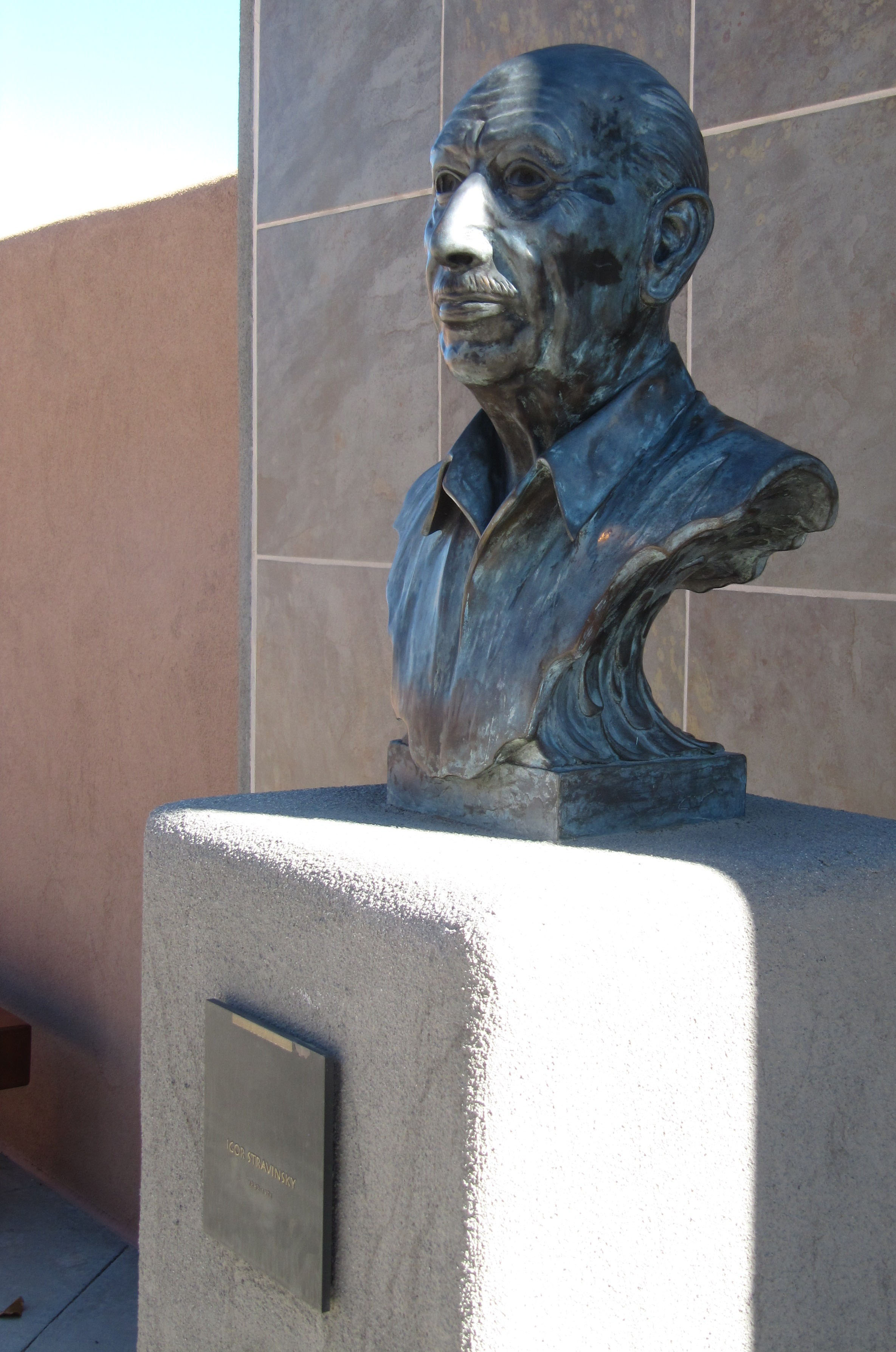
Bust of Stravinsky on the Stravinsky Terrace

The totally open-air theatre was designed to seat 480 and was built for $115,000 on a site carefully selected by Crosby and an acoustician friend, who fired off a series of rifle shots until they found the perfect natural location for an outdoor theatre. It was "the only outdoor theatre in America exclusively designed for opera". Audience members sat on benches. The Santa Fe firm of McHugh, Hooker, Bradley P. Kidder and Associates were architects for the original theatre; lead architects John W. McHugh and Van Dorn Hooker worked with the acoustical engineer Jack Purcell of Bolt, Beranek and Newman (Boston and Los Angeles). The structural design calculations were performed by Sergio Acosta, a structural engineer and immigrant from Panama who graduated from the University of Texas and was a resident of Albuquerque, NM from 1948 until his death at age 78.

This was the location of the inaugural performance on opening night, July 3, 1957. Madama Butterfly played to a sold-out crowd. By the end of the eight-week season, the 12,000 people who attended accounted for sales at 90% of capacity.

A mezzanine was added in 1965 but, on July 27, 1967, four weeks into the season, a fire destroyed the theatre, causing the company to move to a local downtown high school for the remainder of the season. From the Sweeney Gymnasium, they created the "Sweeney Opera House", and completed the season, albeit without most of the original costumes or sets. A huge fund-raising operation took place, backed by Igor Stravinsky, and $2.4 million was raised to rebuild the theatre in time for the following season.

=== Rebuilt theatre, 1968 to 1997 ===
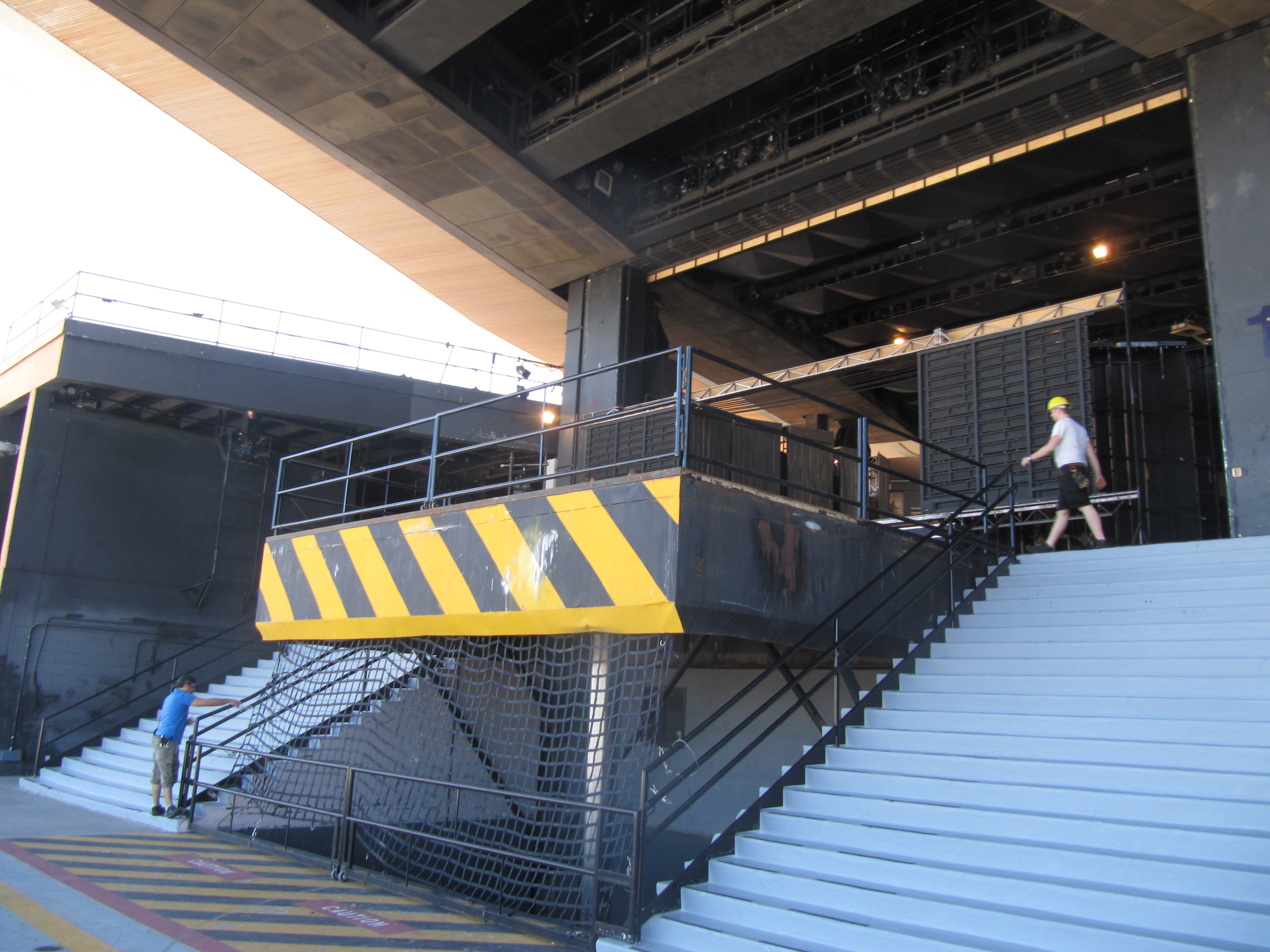
Built for the 1968 theatre and known as the B-Lift, this elevator raises scenery from the storage area three floors below the stage to stage level

The second theatre, a new open-air house seating 1,889, was ready for the start of the new season on June 26, 1968. Just like the company's opening night in 1957, it presented Puccini’s Madama Butterfly.

The new theatre was also designed by McHugh and Kidder. One of its principal features was the partial opening of the roof towards the middle of the orchestra section, provided by the curving, audience-facing slope of the stage roof and the thrust of the mezzanine and rear orchestra roof forward. Also, the auditorium's sides were open, as was the rear of the stage (although sliding doors could be closed). It provided for spectacular Westward views – as well as giving some centrally located audience members a view of the night sky.

Most of the new theatre's backstage facilities, including scenery construction and storage and costume and props production, were actually constructed below the stage level in order to preserve the open views to the West. Additionally, a large elevator, located immediately behind the stage and known as the "B-Lift", was included and it became the means whereby scenery could be moved up one level from the scene construction shop to the stage or up or down two levels to or from the large scenery storage area located three levels below the stage. The elevator still remains in place.

=== Crosby Theatre, since 1998 ===
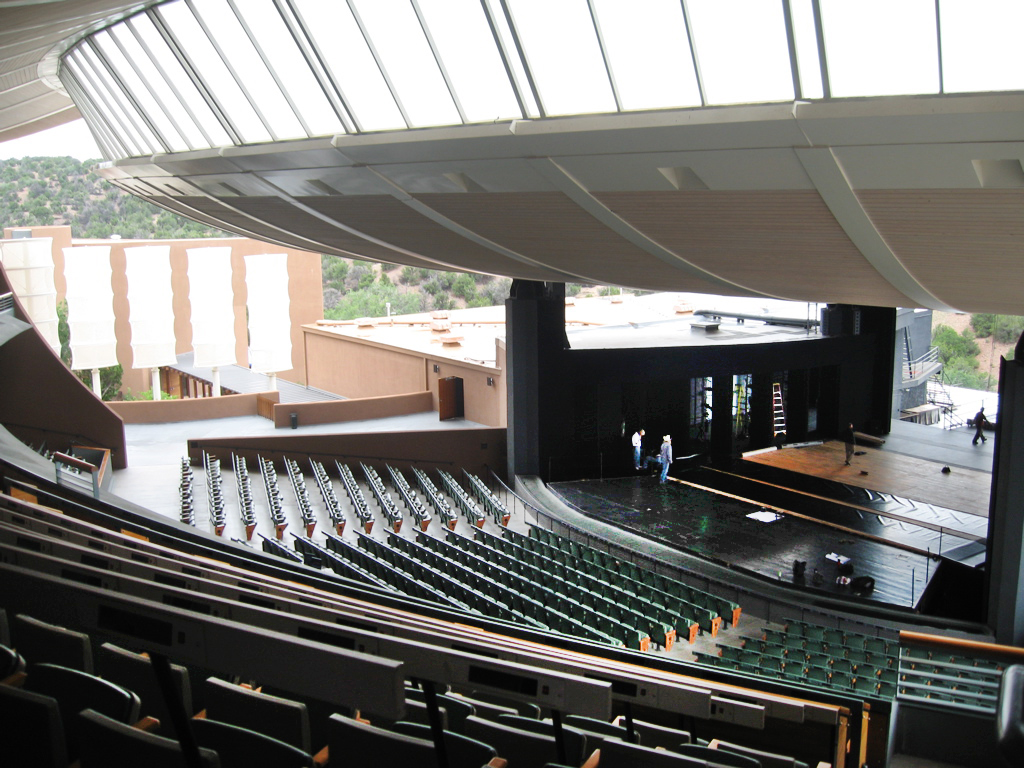
Interior of the Crosby Theatre. The white sail-like wind baffles are visible on the left, the clerestory window provides light, and the rear of the stage is open.

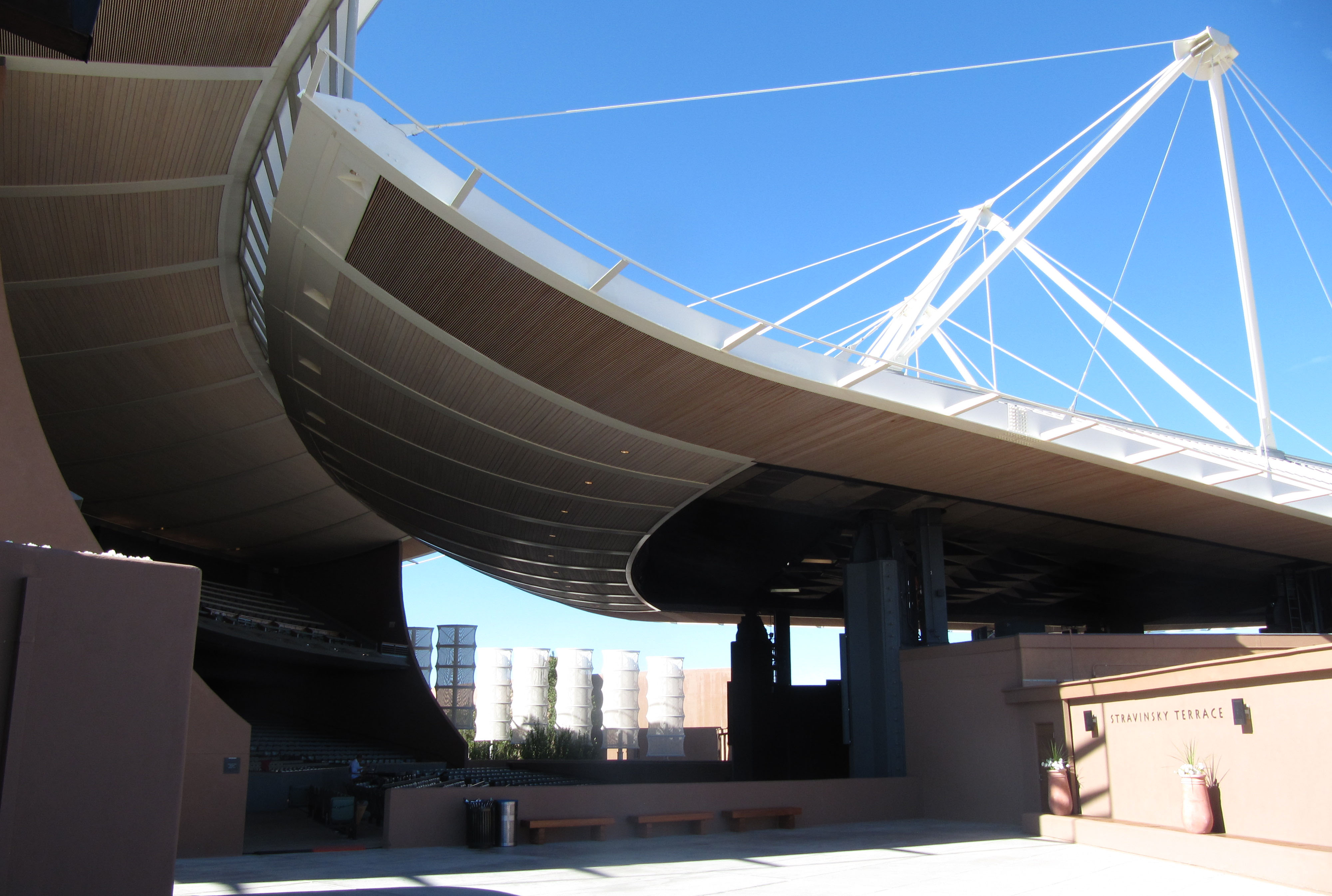
Crosby Theatre looking South

It was renamed the Crosby Theatre not only to honor the founder's death in 2002, but also used to reflect the contributions of his parents, the present theatre was designed by the architectural firm headed by James Polshek of New York.

It was built during extensive reconstruction, which followed the tearing down of the auditorium of the 1968 theatre at the end of the opera season in late August 1997. The stage and backstage facilities such as dressing rooms and the costume shop as well as the scenery construction shop remained in place. The new theatre was completed in ten months for an early July 1998 opening of a new season. Like the previous opening nights of 1957 and 1968, it featured a performance of Madama Butterfly this time sung by Miriam Gauci, the Maltese soprano who had her debut in the same role at the SFO in 1987.

With fewer storm-related problems (and, with a higher stage roof providing a better view of the Westward landscape), the theatre now seats 2,128 plus 106 standees, although it has a strikingly intimate feel. It added a wider and more complete roof structure, with the new front and rear portions supported by cables and joined together with a clerestory window. This offers protection from the sky, but with the sides remaining open to the elements. The presence of wind baffles and, since 2001, Stieren Hall, the orchestra's rehearsal hall, has helped improve exposure on the southern, windward side of the auditorium. A performance of The 13th Child on August 9, 2019, was paused for twenty minutes due to inclement passing weather, a first in the Santa Fe Opera's history.

In 1999, as an alternative to installing a translation system using the projected supertitles (or surtitles), an electronic titles system was installed in the Crosby Theatre. Invented by Figaro Systems of Santa Fe (and only the second one installed after the Metropolitan Opera's Met Titles in 1995), the system provides small rectangular electronic screens in front of each patron's seat, showing a two-line translation of the sung text in either English or Spanish. The system has the possibility of handling up to six languages.

Along with operas, the Crosby Theatre has also played host to numerous concerts in recent years, such as: Jon Batiste, The B-52s, Wilco, and also St. Vincent and Andrew Bird.

=== Stieren Orchestra Hall ===
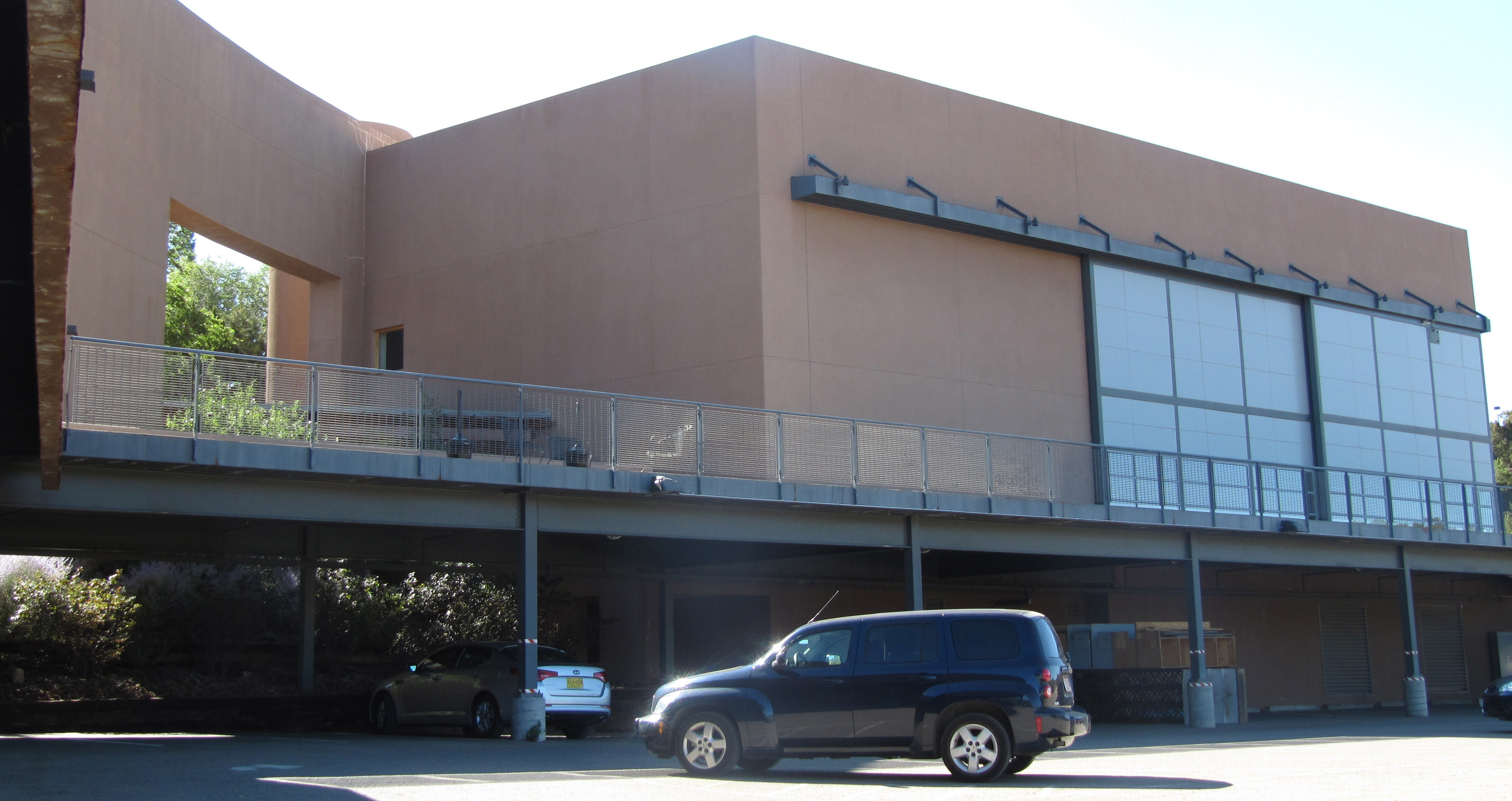
Rear view 3-level Stieren Hall with its large doors to accommodate large pieces of scenery moved along the deck which adjoins the theatre

Completed for the 2001 season under the patronage of Arthur and Jane Stieren, the hall fulfills the long-standing need for an orchestra rehearsal hall. Constructed on three levels with a total of 12,650 square feet (1,175 m^{2}), the building is also used for lectures, recitals, and social events.

On its main level, guide rails attached to the ceiling indicate the dimensions of the theatre's main stage and offstage wings. This allows for scenery to be placed correctly, with access via large sliding doors from the scenery deck level, thus allowing fully staged rehearsals. The upper level contains rehearsal studios for one-on-one coaching for singers while the lower level features a large air-conditioned costume storage facility. The roof of Stieren Orchestra Hall is home to 135 solar panels as the SFO begins to move towards solar power.

=== Rehearsal halls ===
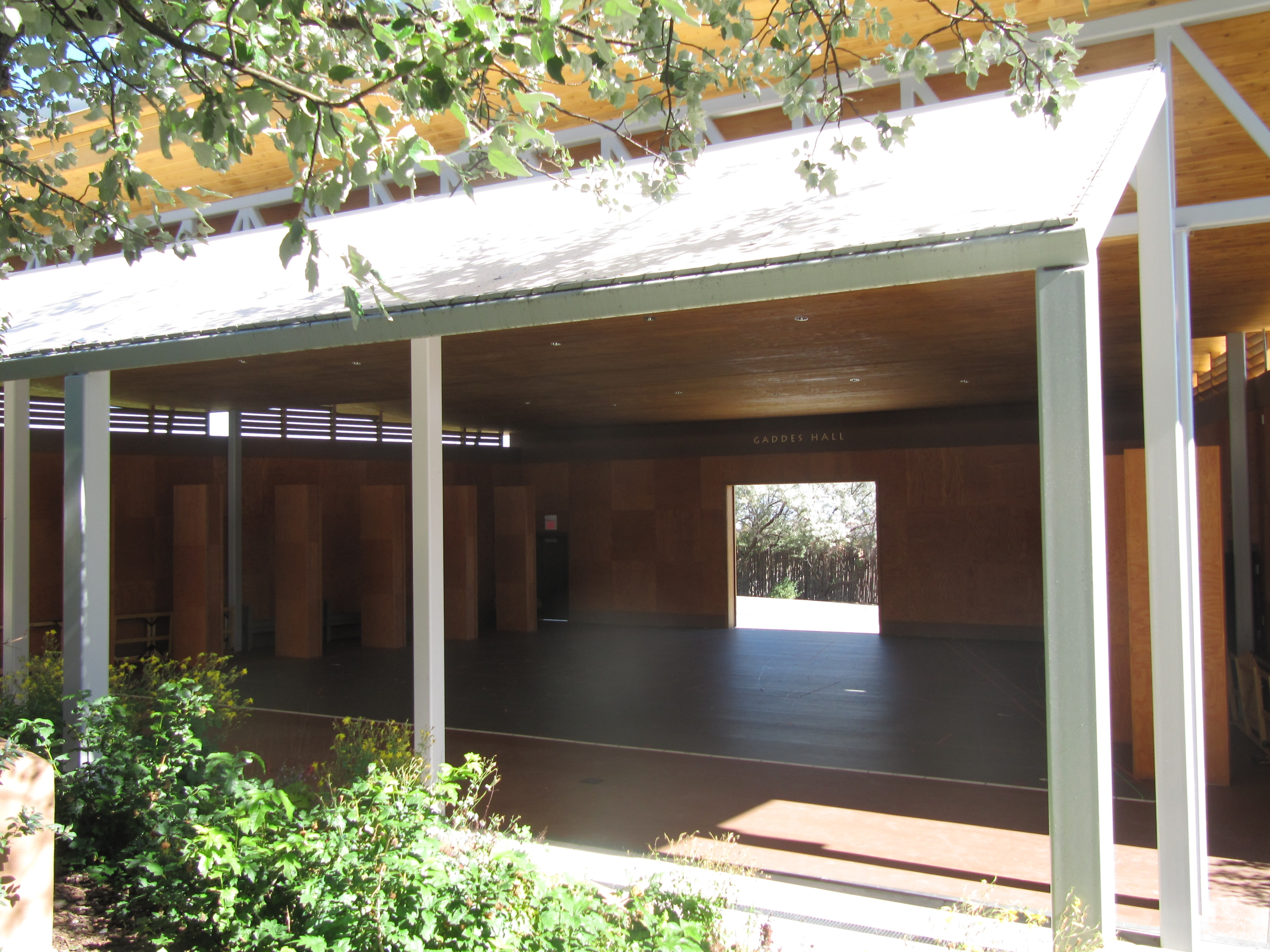
Gaddes Rehearsal Hall

Eight rehearsal halls exist on the campus grounds. They vary in size from the reproduction of the full-scale of the Crosby Theatre's stage and down to individual coaching studios for one-on-one coaching. Of the former group, the newest, completed for the 2010 season, is the Richard Gaddes Rehearsal Hall. It complements the existing full-size O'Shaughnessy Hall, which was rehabilitated for the 2012 season. In addition, six other halls of varying sizes allow several productions to be rehearsed simultaneously.

=== Dapples Pavilion, new cantina ===
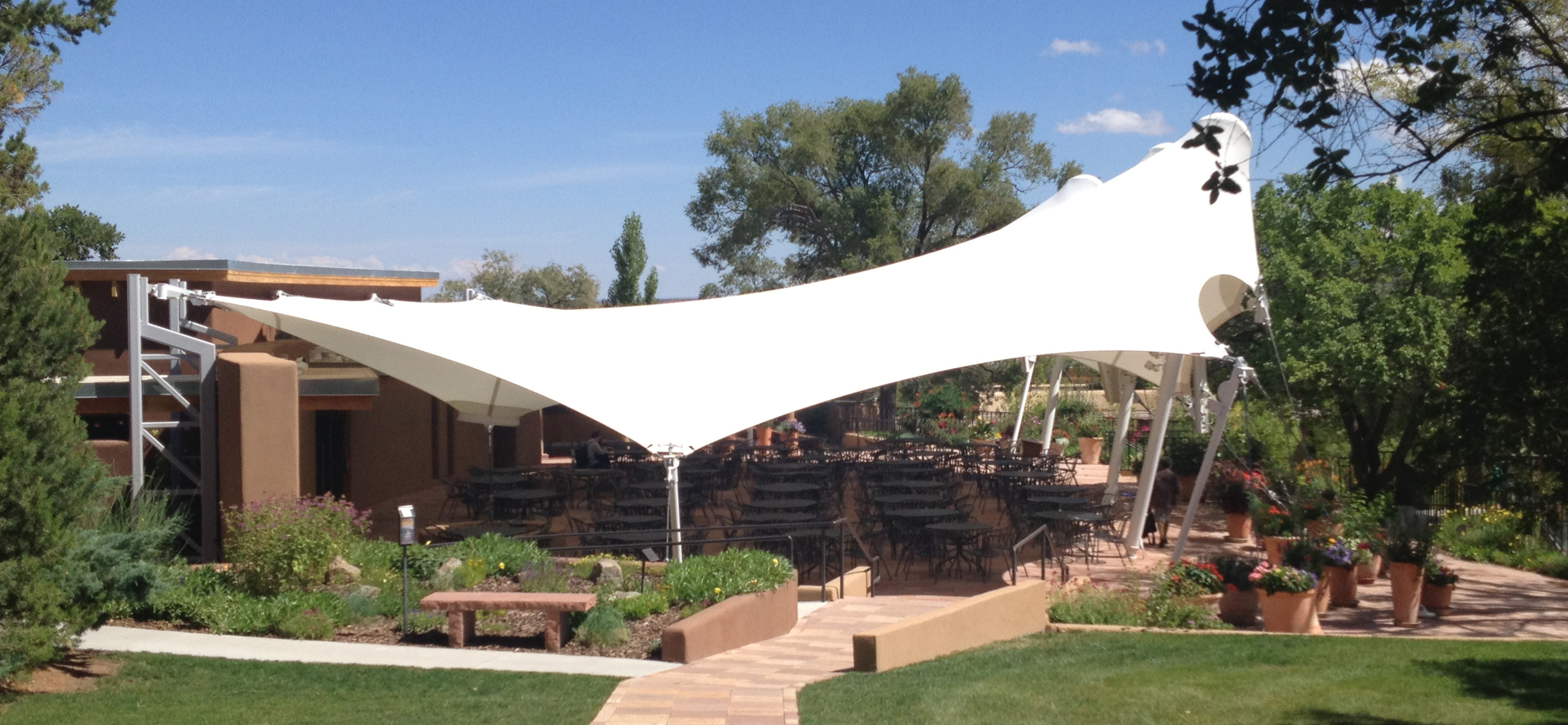
Dapples Pavilion

The original "cantina" dating from the 1970s was completely torn down after the 2007 season and construction of a new one was completed in time for the opening of the 2008 season. It contains modern kitchen facilities, new serving stations, and generally good protection from the rain for its patrons. Its arching roof matches the architectural lines of the Crosby Theatre.

Now known as the Dapples Pavilion (named after long-time supporter Florence Dapples), the cantina supplies season-long food and drink for the staff and artists from breakfast time to mid-afternoon. In addition, it functions as the location for pre-performance Preview Buffet dinners for up to about 200 members of the general public in the evenings. The evening includes an introductory talk about the evening's opera.

== See also ==
- List of operas performed at The Santa Fe Opera
- List of opera festivals
