= Teatro degli Arcimboldi =

Theatre in Milan, Italy

Coordinates: 45°30′51.43″N 9°12′50.13″E

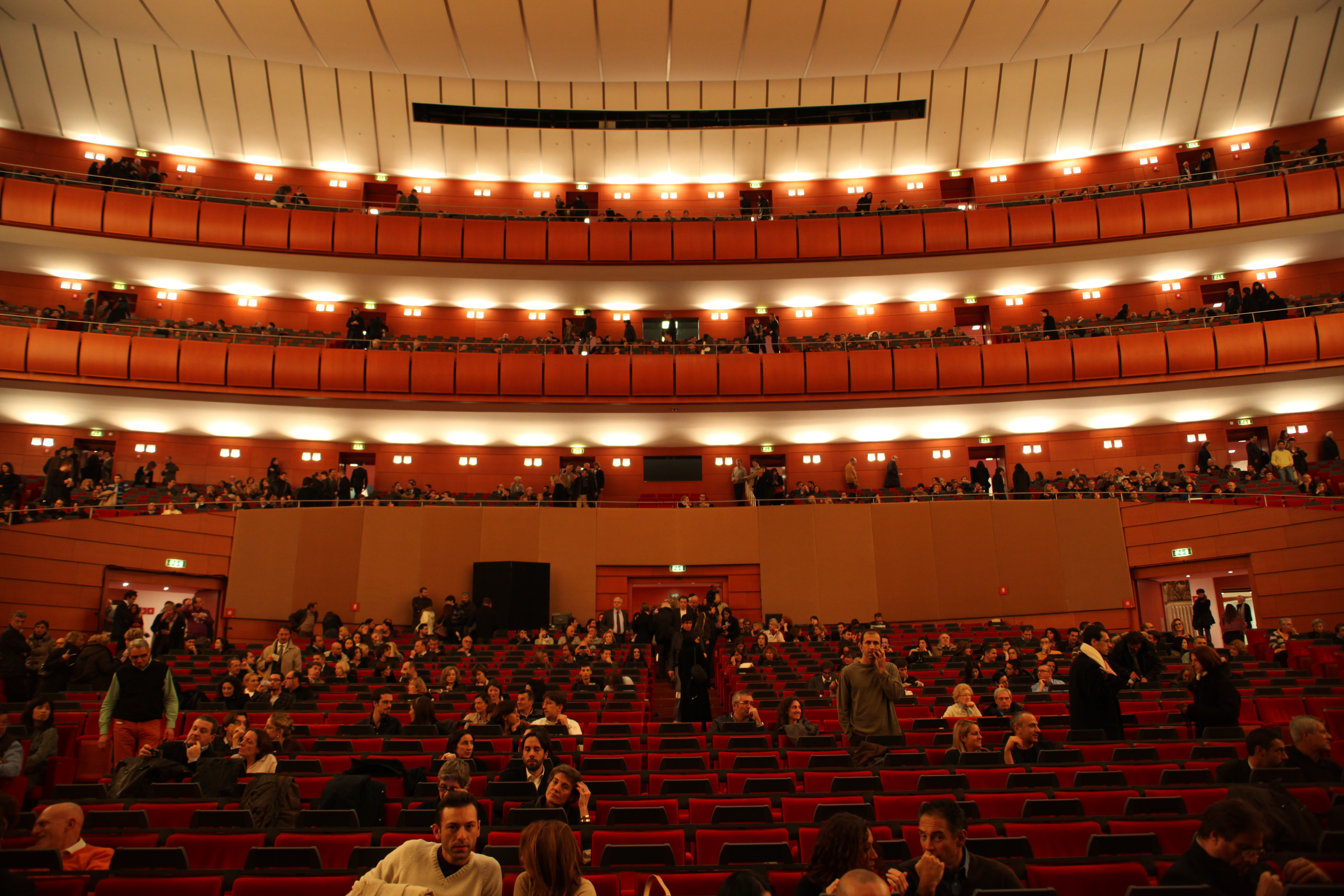
Teatro degli Arcimboldi (2009)

The Teatro degli Arcimboldi is a theatre and opera house in Milan. It was built over a 27-month period in anticipation of the closure and subsequent nearly three-year-long renovation of Milan's La Scala opera house in December 2001. It is located 4.5 miles from the city centre in a converted Pirelli tire factory, in an area known as Bicocca.

Designed by Vittorio Gregotti in collaboration with Mario Botta and Elisabetta Fabbri, the fan-shaped, two-level, 2,375-seat auditorium was inaugurated with a performance of Verdi's La traviata on 19 January 2002, and went on to allow the continuation of La Scala's 2001/2002 opera season. Following La Scala reopening on 7 December 2004, Teatro degli Arcimboldi expanded its program, hosting musicals and performances of jazz, classical and pop music.

== Sources ==
- Beauvert, Thierry, Opera Houses of the World, New York: The Vendome Press, 1995
- Lynn, Karyl Charna, Italian Opera Houses and Festivals, Lanham, Maryland: The Scarecrow Press, Inc., 2005. ISBN 0-8108-5359-0
- Plantamura, Carol, The Opera Lover's Guide to Europe, Secaucus, New Jersey: Carol Publishing Group/Citadel Press, 1996, ISBN 0-8065-1842-1

== See also ==
- Teatro alla Scala
- List of opera houses
- Radio Marconi
