= Fondation pour l'audition =

French foundation

Fondation Pour l'Audition
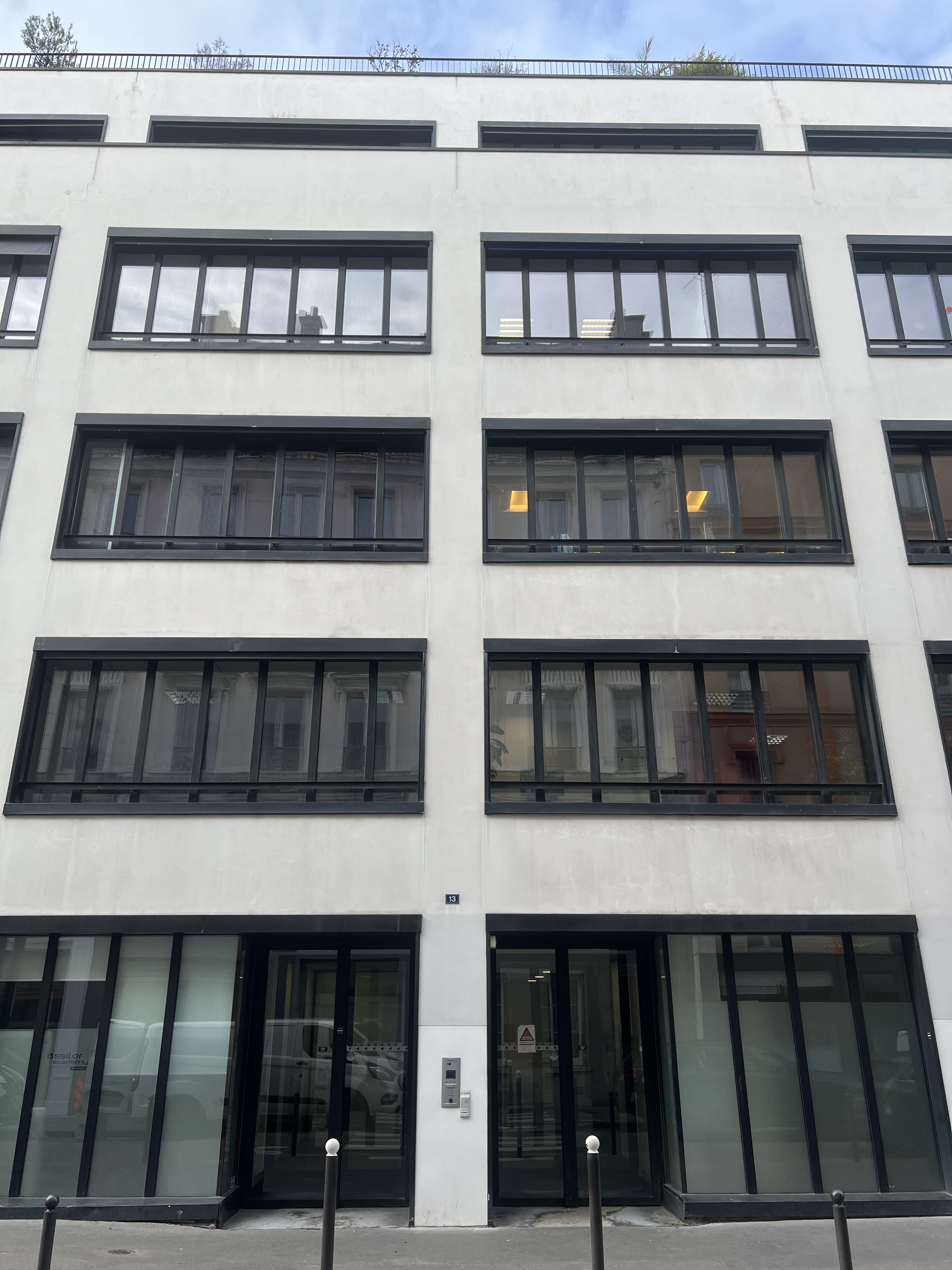
- Motto: A l'écoute de la vie
- Established: 2015
- Mission: Fundamental research
- Focus: hearing
- Location: Paris, France
- Coordinates: 48.85015106201172°N 2.3720009326934814°E
- Interactive map of Fondation Pour l'Audition
- Website: https://www.fondationpourlaudition.org
- Position in France

The Fondation Pour l'Audition is a French scientific foundation for research about hearing impairment. The foundation is located in the 12th arrondissement of Paris.

== Overview ==
The Fondation Pour l'Audition was created in 2015 by Françoise Bettencourt Meyers, Jean-Pierre Meyers and the Fondation Bettencourt Schueller.

The foundation receives a grant from the Fondation de France.

The foundation welcomes Doctors from Denmark, United States, Belgium, United Kingdom and France.

It is a sponsor of the research center Institut de l'audition.
