= Edoardo Vitale =

Italian orchestral conductor

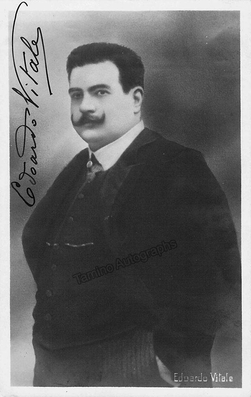
Edoardo Vitale

Edoardo Vitale (29 November 1872 – 12 December 1937) was an Italian orchestral conductor. He was director of La Scala in substitution of Toscanini from 1908 to 1910, though he conducted most of his career at the Teatro Costanzi, now Teatro dell'Opera di Roma. His orchestration and conducting has been described as passionate.

== Biography ==
Vitale was born in Naples, Italy, in 1872. As a boy he went to Rome, and by the time he was 14 he was already directing some operettas at the Teatro Metastasio, garnering acclaim for his conducting. He studied at the Conservatorio Santa Cecilia in Rome. Starting from 1893, he was a professor at the Santa Cecilia.

From 1908 to 1910 he was a substitute of Toscanini at La Scala. He was the first to direct Richard Strauss' Elektra in Italy, which he directed at La Scala in 1909. He directed Cherubini's Médée in 1909, also at La Scala.

He conducted mostly at the Teatro Costanzi. He also conducted in foreign countries.

He was conductor of the orchestra of the lyrica company of Walter Moachi's company, which performed in Buenos Aires and Rio de Janeiro in 1925.

His son was Riccardo Vitale, who became Director of Rome Opera House from the 1940s to early 1970s.
