= Radio Marconi =

Italian company

Radio Marconi S.r.l.
- Company type: S.r.l.
- Industry: Advanced multimedia systems
- Founded: 1993 by Stefano De Lissandri
- Headquarters: Lecco, Italy
- Area served: Worldwide
- Products: electronic libretto, subtitles, supertitles, seat back titles, multimedia systems, foreign languages translators
- Website: www.radiomarconi.it

Radio Marconi is an Italian-based company that has installed and serviced audio-visual and radio equipment since 1993. It designs interactive multimedia communication systems. The company has also developed several applications for theaters, conference centers, museums and stadiums. During its lifespan, the company has become a service center for brands such as Sony, Sennheiser, Neumann, and Televic, with customers based in radio, television, theater, public authorities and security forces.

== History ==
In 2004, after completing a project for the Teatro alla Scala in Milan, Radio Marconi was transformed from a uninominal to a limited liability company.

Radio Marconi began focusing on the development of proprietary technologies in 2006 and started its international expansion, with the first international project realized in 2007 at the Oslo Opera House. The company made a patent application in Italy in November 2007.

In 2009, it further developed technology aimed at low consumption multimedia technology (known as MODE23). Patent applications were expanded to Europe, United States, Canada, China, Oman, Qatar and United Arab Emirates. In 2010, the company obtained a patent for its MODE23 technology in its native country. Its applications extend to other parallel markets, such as those involved with sport.

In 2011, Radio Marconi was involved with the first worldwide large scale installation of interactive multimedia technology at the Royal Opera House Muscat in Oman. This project was a finalist in the "Most InAVative Leisure & Entertainment Facility" category at the InAVation Awards 2013.

In 2012 Radio Marconi obtained the European patent 216.855 for its MODE23 technology

== Awards ==
In 2011 Radio Marconi was given the Cisco company's "Innovation Award". The company was described as "the most innovative business impacting network of the year". In the same year Radio Marconi was hosted at Cisco's booth at SMAU 2011.

In 2013 Radio Marconi is finalist in the EMEA "Most InAVative Leisure & Entertainment Facility" category at the InAVation Awards 2013, for the interactive multimedia seatback system integrated into the Royal Opera House in Muscat.

== Technology and products ==
The company is known mainly for its surtitle and supertitle systems, as well as the electronic libretto, seat back titles, and libretto translation technology. It is also known for its wireless and touch screen technology. These devices are not computer-based, resulting in no moving parts, no sound, and no overheating. These products allow users to view video channels, download content, and participate in surveys, among other applications. Radio Marconi systems can reproduce any existing linguistic character and can be used for translation and the creation and sharing of multilingual information, such as alerts, public notices, and other general information.

== See also ==
- List of companies of Italy
