= La Scala =

Opera house in Milan, Italy

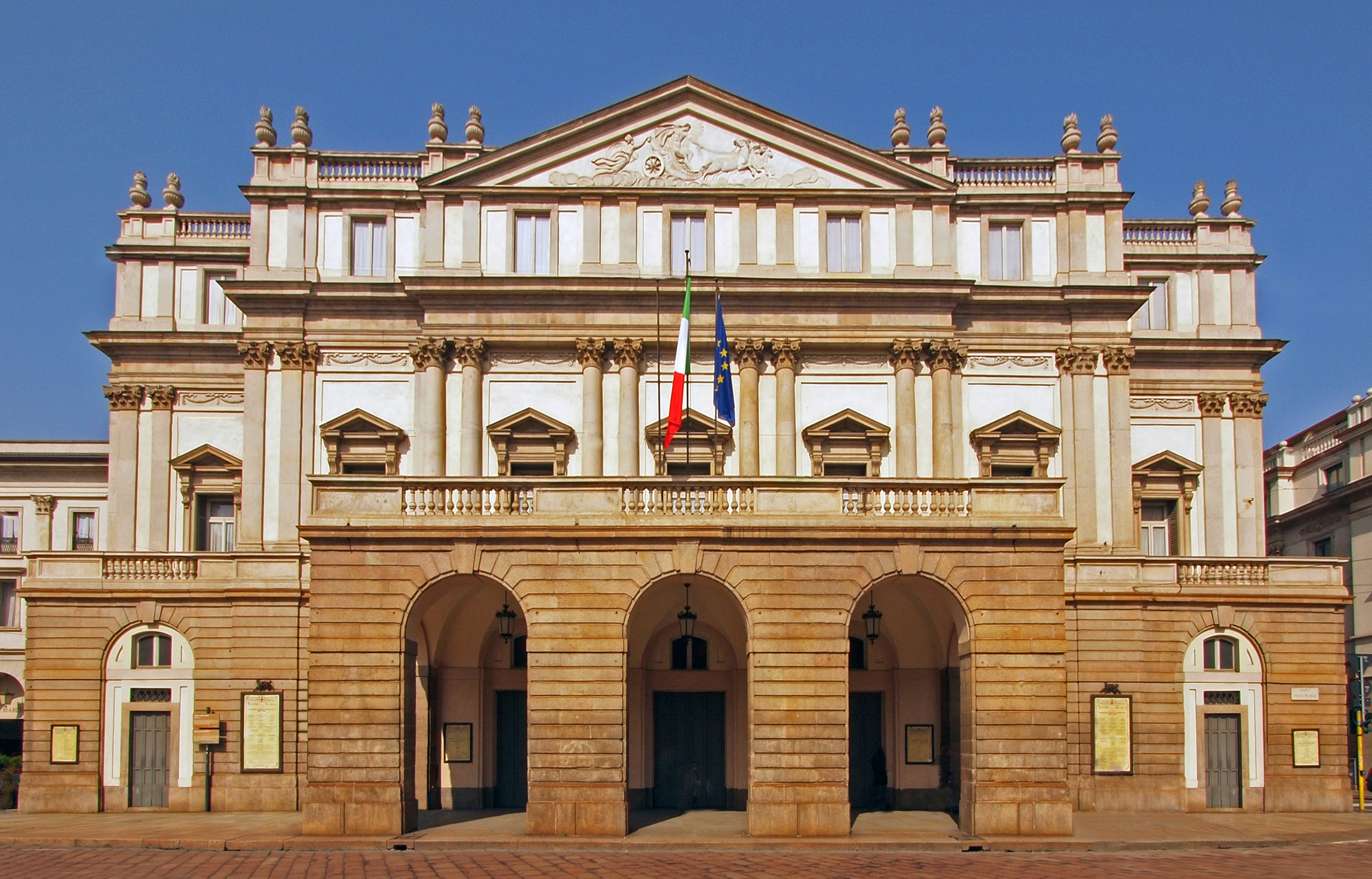
- Exterior of La Scala
- Interactive map of La Scala
- Address: Piazza della Scala; Milan; Italy
- Coordinates: 45°28′03″N 09°11′21″E
- Owner: City of Milan
- Capacity: 2,030

Construction
- Opened: 1778
- Architect: Giuseppe Piermarini

Website
- Official website

La Scala (UK: /læ ˈskɑːlə/, US: /lɑː -/, Italian: [la ˈskaːla]; officially Teatro alla Scala [teˈaːtro alla ˈskaːla], lit. 'Theatre at the Scala') is a historic opera house in Milan, Italy. The theatre was inaugurated on 3 August 1778 and was originally known as il Nuovo Regio Ducale Teatro alla Scala (lit. 'the New Royal Ducal Theatre at the Scala', which previously was a church). The premiere performance was Antonio Salieri's Europa riconosciuta.

Most of Italy's greatest operatic artists, and many of the finest singers from around the world, have appeared at La Scala. The theatre is regarded as being one of the leading opera and ballet theatres globally. It is home to the La Scala Theatre Chorus, La Scala Theatre Ballet, La Scala Theatre Orchestra, and the Filarmonica della Scala orchestra. The theatre also has an associate school, known as the La Scala Theatre Academy (Italian: Accademia Teatro alla Scala), which offers professional training in music, dance, stagecraft, and stage management.

== Overview ==
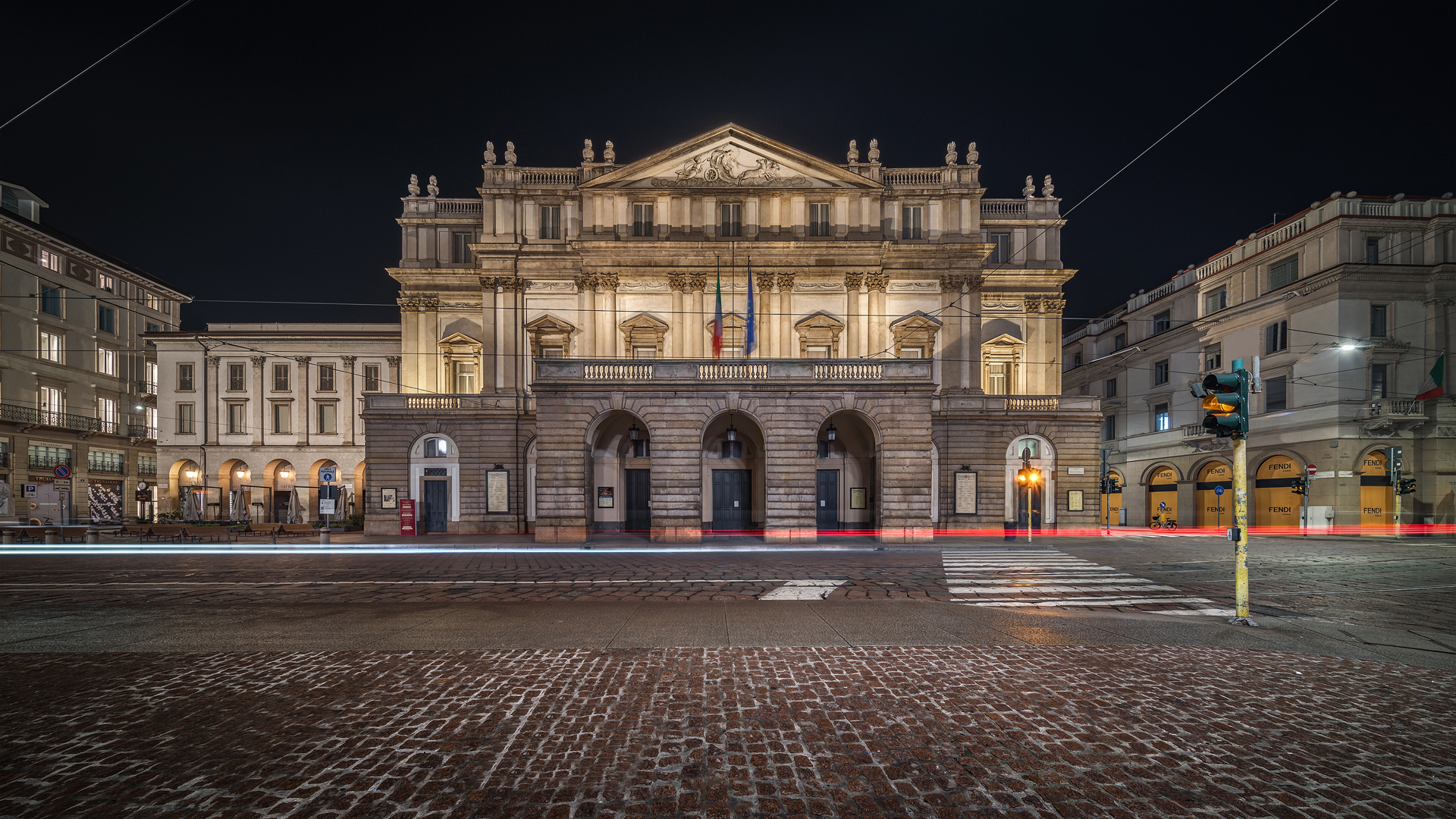
The Teatro alla Scala in Milan, by night

La Scala's season opens on 7 December, Saint Ambrose's Day, the feast day of Milan's patron saint. All performances must end before midnight and long operas start earlier in the evening when necessary.

The Museo Teatrale alla Scala (La Scala Theatre Museum), accessible from the theatre's foyer and a part of the house, contains a collection of paintings, drafts, statues, costumes, and other documents regarding the history of La Scala and of opera in general. La Scala also hosts the Accademia d'Arti e Mestieri dello Spettacolo (Academy for the Performing Arts). Its goal is to train a new generation of young musicians, technical staff, and dancers (at the Scuola di Ballo del Teatro alla Scala, one of the academy's divisions).

Above the boxes, La Scala has a gallery—called the loggione—where the less wealthy can watch the performances. The gallery is typically crowded with the most critical opera aficionados, known as the loggionisti, who can be ecstatic or merciless towards singers' perceived successes or failures. For their failures, artists receive a "baptism of fire" from these aficionados, and fiascos are long remembered. For example, in 2006, tenor Roberto Alagna left the stage after being booed during a performance of Aida, forcing his understudy, Antonello Palombi, to quickly replace him mid-scene without time to change into a costume. Alagna did not return to the production.

== History ==
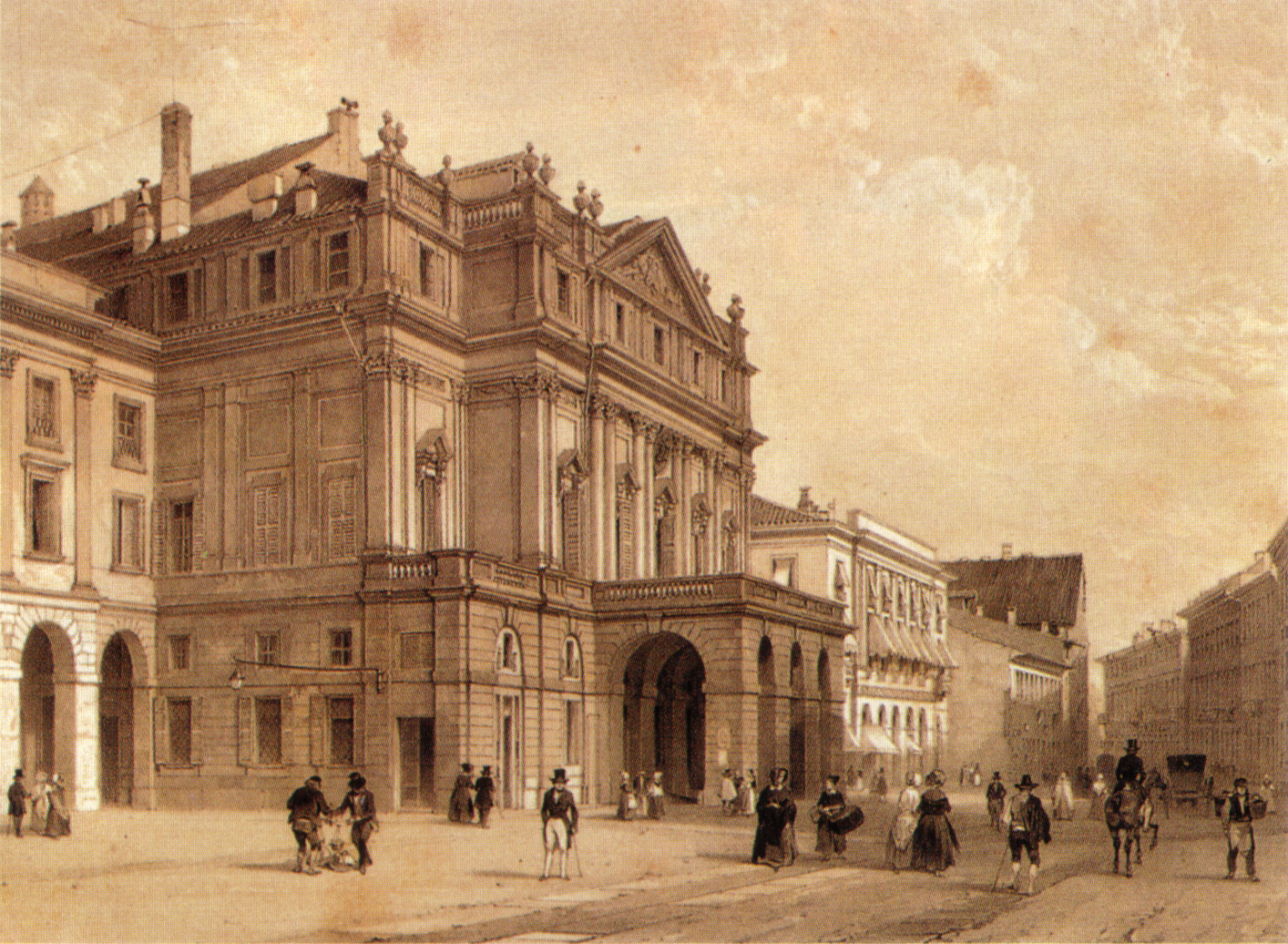
A nineteenth-century depiction of the Teatro alla Scala

A fire destroyed the previous theatre, the Teatro Regio Ducale, on 25 February 1776, after a carnival gala. A group of ninety wealthy Milanese, who owned private boxes in the theatre, wrote to Archduke Ferdinand of Austria-Este asking for a new theatre and a provisional one to be used while completing the new one. The neoclassical architect Giuseppe Piermarini produced an initial design. However, it was rejected by Count Firmian (the governor of the then Austrian Lombardy).

A second plan was accepted in 1776 by Empress Maria Theresa. The new theatre was built on the former location of the church of Santa Maria della Scala, from which the theatre gets its name. The church was deconsecrated and demolished. Over a period of two years, the theatre was completed by Pietro Marliani, Pietro Nosetti, and Antonio and Giuseppe Fe. The theatre had a total of "3,000 or so" seats organized into 678 pit-stalls, arranged in six tiers of boxes above which is the 'loggione' or two galleries. Its stage is one of the largest in Italy (16.15m d x 20.4m w x 26m h).

Building expenses were covered by the sale of boxes, which were lavishly decorated by their owners, impressing observers such as Stendhal. La Scala (as it came to be known) soon became the preeminent meeting place for noble and wealthy Milanese people. In the tradition of the times, the main floor had no chairs, and spectators watched the shows standing up. The orchestra was in full sight, as the orchestra pit had not yet been built. As with most of the theatres at that time, La Scala was also a casino, with gamblers sitting in the foyer. Conditions in the auditorium, too, could be frustrating for the opera lover, as Mary Shelley discovered in September 1840:

At the Opera they were giving Otto Nicolai's Templario. Unfortunately, as is well known, the theatre of La Scala serves, not only as the universal drawing-room for all the society of Milan but every sort of trading transaction, from horse-dealing to stock-jobbing, is carried on in the pit; so that brief and far between are the snatches of melody one can catch.

La Scala was originally illuminated with 84 oil lamps mounted on the stage and another thousand in the rest of the theatre. To reduce the risks of fire, several rooms were filled with hundreds of water buckets. In time, oil lamps were replaced by gas lamps; these, in turn, were replaced by electric lights in 1883.

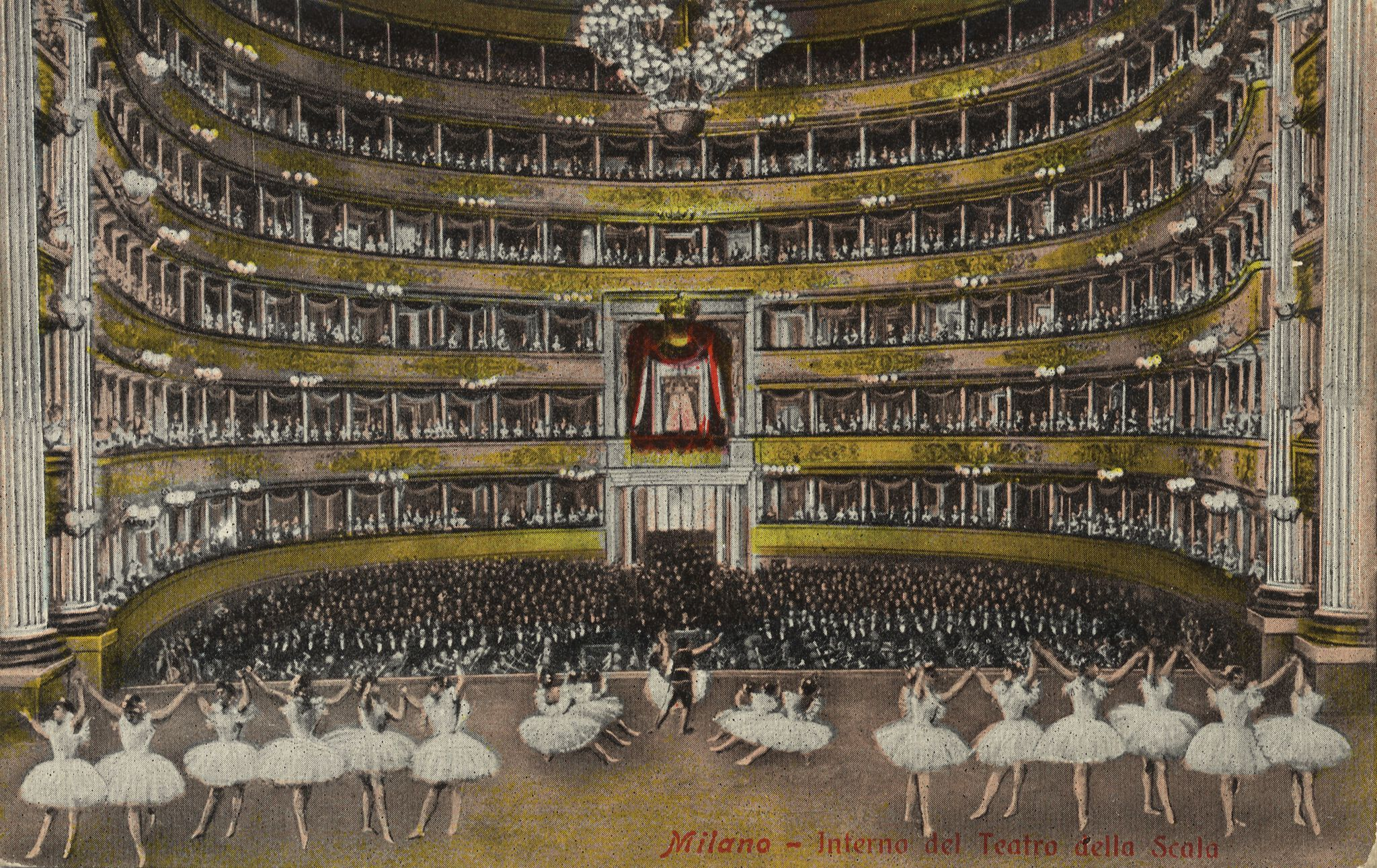
Interior of the opera house in 1900

The original structure was renovated in 1907 when it was given its current layout with 1,987 seats. In 1943, during World War II, La Scala was severely damaged by bombing. It was rebuilt and reopened on 11 May 1946, with a memorable concert conducted by Arturo Toscanini—twice La Scala's principal conductor and an associate of the composers Giuseppe Verdi and Giacomo Puccini—with a soprano solo by Renata Tebaldi, which created a sensation.

La Scala hosted the first productions of many famous operas and had a special relationship with Verdi. However, for several years, Verdi did not allow his work to be played here, as some of his music had been modified (he said "corrupted") by the orchestra. This dispute originated in a disagreement over the production of his Giovanna d'Arco in 1845; however, the composer later conducted his Requiem there on 25 May 1874. He announced in 1886 that La Scala would host the premiere of what was to become his penultimate opera, Otello. The premiere of his last opera, Falstaff was also given in the theatre.

=== Filarmonica della Scala ===
In 1982, the Filarmonica della Scala orchestra was established to develop a symphonic repertoire to add to La Scala's operatic tradition, the orchestra drawing its members from the larger pool of musicians that comprise the Orchestra della Scala. The Filarmonica was conducted first by Carlo Maria Giulini, then by Riccardo Muti, plus many collaborative relations with some of the greatest conductors of the time.

== Recent developments ==
=== 1950s ===
The Chandelier of La Scala

As early as 1958 R. Vermeulen of Philips Electronics experimented with "loudspeakers for stereo reverberation" at La Scala, which were "concealed in the cove along the ceiling".

=== Major renovation, 2002 to 2004 ===
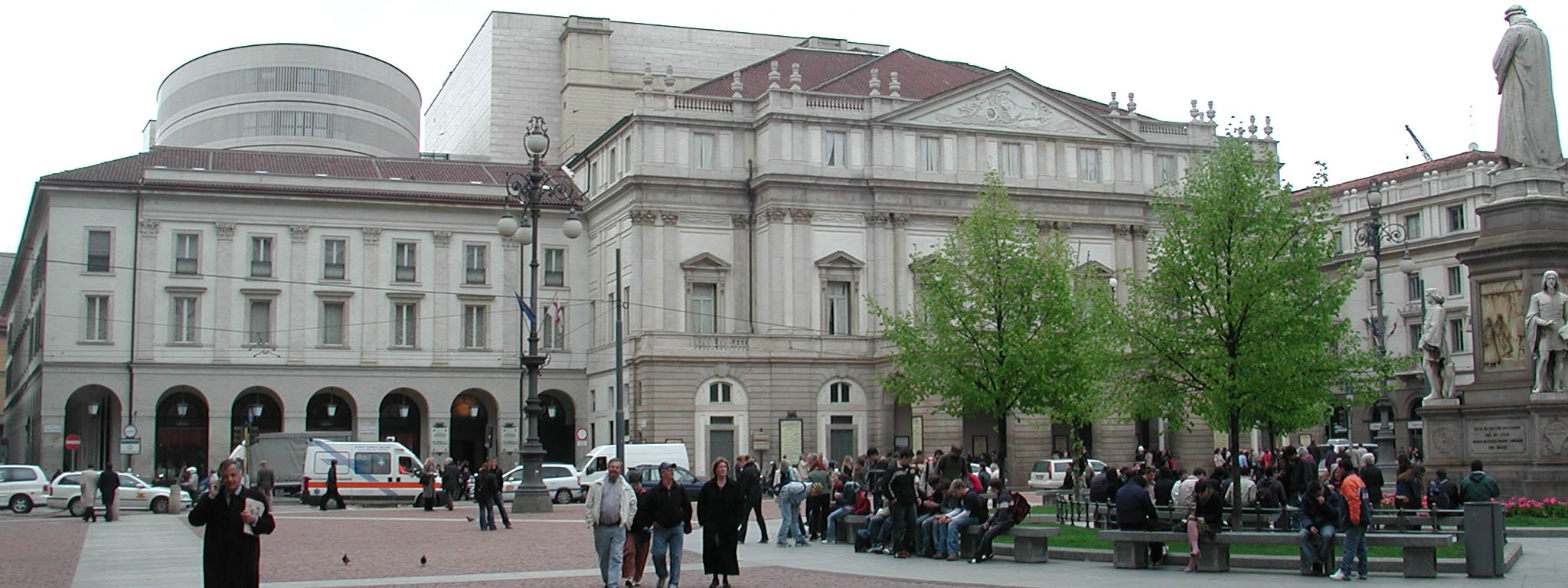
The exterior of La Scala in 2005 after the 2002/04 renovations

The theatre underwent a major renovation from early 2002 to late 2004. The theatre closed following the traditional 7 December 2001 season-opening performances of Otello, which ran through December. From 19 January 2002 to November 2004, the opera company transferred to the new Teatro degli Arcimboldi, built in the Pirelli-Bicocca industrial area 4.5 miles (7.2 km) from the city center.

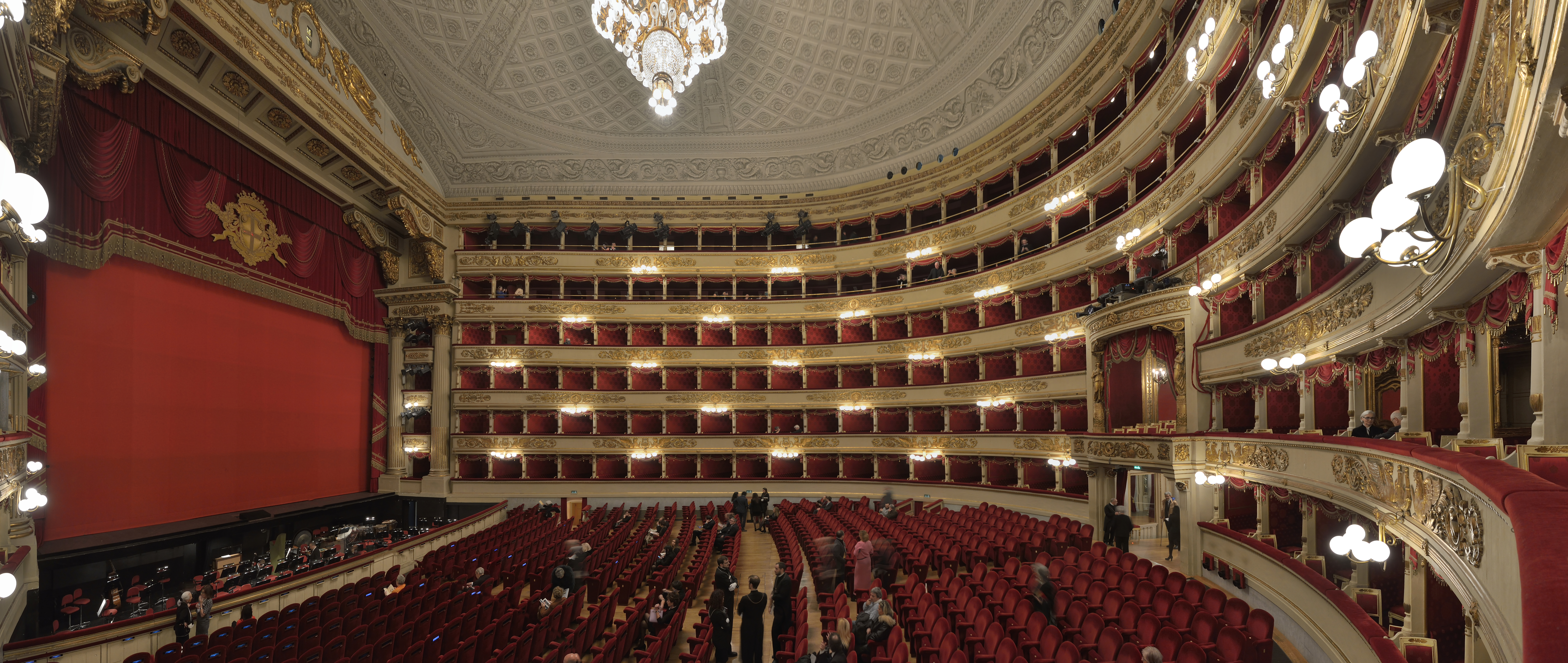
The theatre's restored interior

The renovation by architect Mario Botta proved controversial, as preservationists feared that historic details would be lost. However, the opera company was satisfied with the improvements to the structure and the sound quality, which was enhanced when the heavy red carpets in the hall were removed. The stage was entirely rebuilt, and an enlarged backstage allows more sets to be stored, permitting more productions.

Seats now include monitors for the electronic libretto system provided by Radio Marconi, an Italian company, allowing audiences to follow opera libretti in English and Italian in addition to the original language. The opera house re-opened on 7 December 2004 with a production, conducted by Riccardo Muti, of Salieri's Europa riconosciuta, the opera performed at La Scala's inauguration in 1778. Tickets for the re-opening fetched up to €2,000.

The renovations cost a reported €61 million and left a budget shortfall that the opera house overcame in 2006.

=== 2005 onward ===
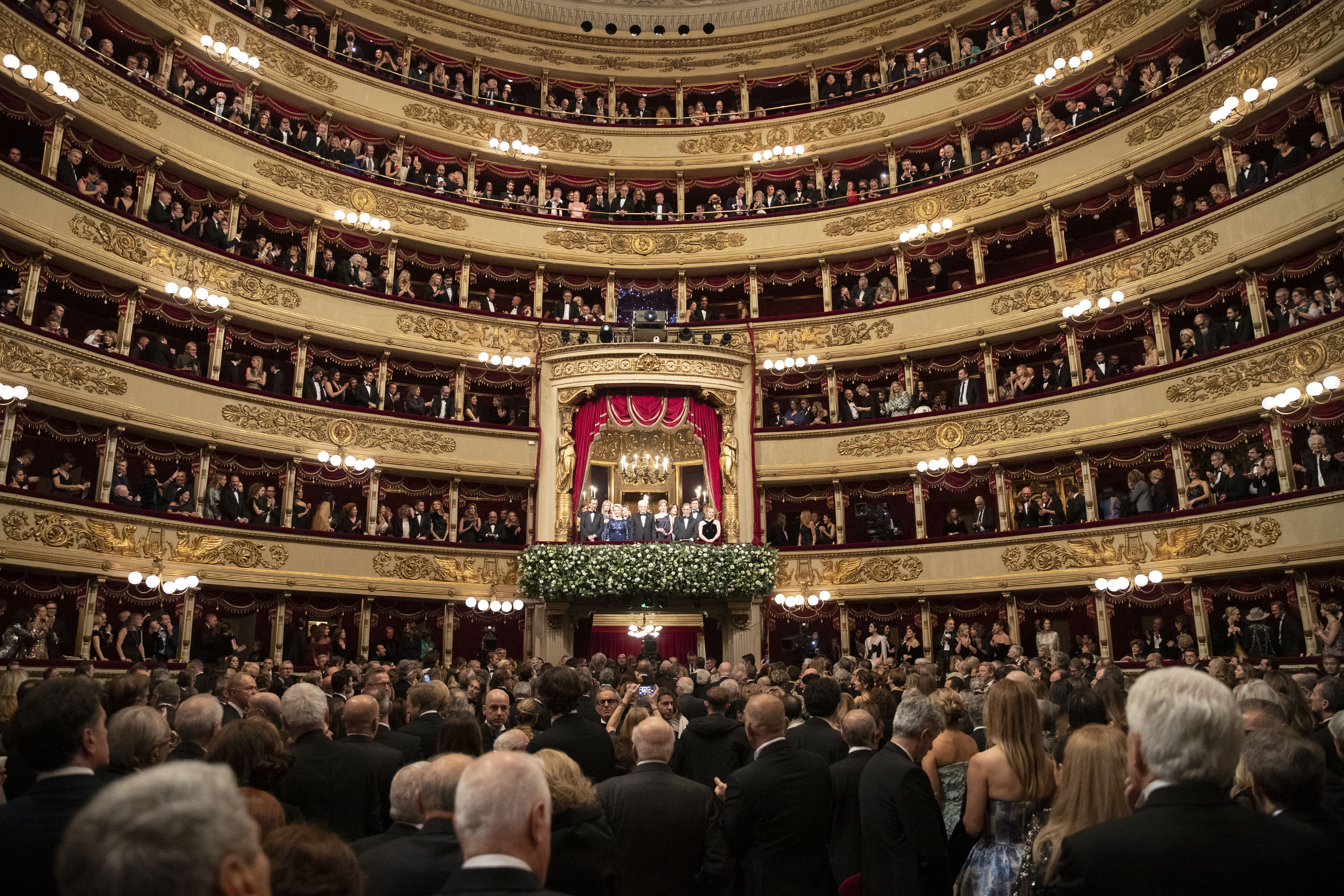
The inauguration of the 2022–23 opera and ballet season at the Teatro alla Scala

Carlo Fontana, the general manager of La Scala since 1990, was dismissed in February 2005 by the board of governors over differences with the music director, Riccardo Muti. The resulting staff backlash caused serious disruptions and staff strikes. In a statement, the theatre's board said it was "urgent to unify the theatre's management". On 16 March 2005, the La Scala orchestra and other staff overwhelmingly approved a no-confidence motion against Muti. They demanded the resignation of Fontana's replacement, Mauro Meli. Muti had already been forced to cancel a concert a few days earlier because of the disagreements. Italy's culture minister, Giuliano Urbani, supported the conductor but called for urgent action by management to safeguard the smooth operation and prestige of La Scala. On 2 April 2005, Muti resigned from La Scala, citing "hostility" from staff members.

In May 2005, Stéphane Lissner, formerly head of the Aix-en-Provence Festival, was appointed General Manager and artistic director of La Scala, becoming the first non-Italian in its history to hold the office. On 15 May 2006, Daniel Barenboim was named Maestro Scaligero, or de facto principal guest conductor of the company. In October 2011, Barenboim was appointed the next music director of La Scala, effective December 2011, with an initial contract of 5 years. In December 2013, management named Riccardo Chailly the next music director of La Scala, effective 1 January 2015.

Stéphane Lissner left La Scala for the Paris Opera. His successor Alexander Pereira, formerly director of the Salzburg Festival, began his tenure on 1 October 2014. In June 2019 it was announced that Pereira would leave in 2020 and would be replaced by Dominique Meyer. La Scala was originally selected to host the opening ceremony of the 134th IOC Session in 2019, but the event was moved to Lausanne, Switzerland after Milan submitted a joint bid with Cortina d'Ampezzo for the 2026 Winter Olympics.

In 2023 La Scala launched a video streaming service dubbed LaScalaTv. The service was enabled by the installation of nine cameras in the auditorium which could be operated remotely. On 1 September 2026, in a bid to reach new audiences and with the sponsorship of Intesa Sanpaolo, the company changed the service from paid to free. As of 2026 the platform included an on-demand library of more than 31 recent opera performances, including David McVicar's staging of the Wagner's Ring Cycle, 13 older recordings, 8 ballets, 26 concerts, and a variety of educational and behind-the-scenes videos.

== Principal conductors or music directors ==
- Franco Faccio (1871–1889)
- Arturo Toscanini (1898–1903)
- Cleofonte Campanini (1903–1905)
- Leopoldo Mugnone (1905–1906)
- Arturo Toscanini (1906–1907)
- Edoardo Vitale (1907–1910)
- Tullio Serafin (1910–1914)
- Gino Marinuzzi (1914–1917)
- Tullio Serafin (1917–1918)
- La Scala was closed from 1918 to 1920
- Arturo Toscanini (1921–1929)
- Victor de Sabata (1929–1953)
- Carlo Maria Giulini (1953–1956)
- Guido Cantelli (1956)
- Antonino Votto (1956–1965)
- Gianandrea Gavazzeni (1965–1968)
- Claudio Abbado (1968–1986)
- Riccardo Muti (1986–2005)
- The position was vacant from April 2005 to December 2007
- Daniel Barenboim (2007–2014)
- Riccardo Chailly (2015–present)
- Myung-Whun Chung (designated, beginning in 2027)

== Premieres ==
See: Category:Opera world premieres at La Scala

- 1778: Europa riconosciuta by Antonio Salieri
- 1794: Demofoonte by Marcos Portugal
- 1800: Idante, ovvero I sacrifici d'Ecate by Marcos Portugal
- 1812: La pietra del paragone by Gioachino Rossini
- 1813: Aureliano in Palmira by Gioachino Rossini
- 1814: Il turco in Italia by Gioachino Rossini
- 1820: Margherita d'Anjou by Giacomo Meyerbeer
- 1827: Il pirata by Vincenzo Bellini
- 1829: La straniera by Vincenzo Bellini
- 1831: Norma by Vincenzo Bellini
- 1833: Lucrezia Borgia by Gaetano Donizetti
- 1835: Maria Stuarda by Gaetano Donizetti
- 1839: Oberto, Conte di San Bonifacio by Giuseppe Verdi
- 1840: Un giorno di regno by Giuseppe Verdi
- 1842: Nabucco by Giuseppe Verdi
- 1843: I Lombardi alla prima crociata by Giuseppe Verdi
- 1845: Giovanna d'Arco by Giuseppe Verdi
- 1868: Mefistofele by Arrigo Boito
- 1870: Il Guarany by Antônio Carlos Gomes
- 1873: Fosca by Antônio Carlos Gomes
- 1876: La Gioconda by Amilcare Ponchielli
- 1879: Maria Tudor by Antônio Carlos Gomes
- 1885: Marion Delorme by Amilcare Ponchielli
- 1887: Otello by Giuseppe Verdi
- 1889: Edgar by Giacomo Puccini
- 1892: La Wally by Alfredo Catalani
- 1893: Falstaff by Giuseppe Verdi
- 1904: Madama Butterfly by Giacomo Puccini
- 1924: Nerone by Arrigo Boito
- 1926: Turandot by Giacomo Puccini
- 1957: Dialogues of the Carmelites by Francis Poulenc
- 1981: Donnerstag aus Licht by Karlheinz Stockhausen
- 1984: Samstag aus Licht by Karlheinz Stockhausen
- 1988: Montag aus Licht by Karlheinz Stockhausen
- 2007: Teneke by Fabio Vacchi
- 2011: Quartett by Luca Francesconi
- 2025: Il nome della rosa by Francesco Filidei
